= VDPAU =

Royalty-free application programming interface and free and open-source library

- Original author: Nvidia
- Developer: freedesktop.org
- Release: September 17, 2009; 17 years ago
- Stable release: 1.5 / March 7, 2022; 4 years ago
- Written in: C, C++
- Operating system: Cross-platform
- Type: API; Library
- License: MIT License
- Website: www.freedesktop.org/wiki/Software/VDPAU/

Video Decode and Presentation API for Unix (VDPAU) is a royalty-free application programming interface (API) as well as its implementation as free and open-source library (libvdpau) distributed under the MIT License. VDPAU is also supported by Nvidia.

The VDPAU interface is to be implemented by device drivers, such as the Nvidia GeForce driver, nouveau, or amdgpu, to offer end-user software, such as VLC media player or GStreamer, a standardized access to available video decompression acceleration hardware in the form of application-specific integrated circuit (ASIC) blocks on graphics processing units (GPU), such as Nvidia's PureVideo or AMD's Unified Video Decoder and make use of it.

VDPAU is targeted at Unix-like operating systems (including Linux, FreeBSD, and Solaris).

== Functional range of the interface ==
VDPAU allows video programs to access the specialized video decoding ASIC on the GPU to offload portions of the video decoding process and video post-processing from the CPU to the GPU.

Currently, the portions capable of being offloaded by VDPAU onto the GPU are motion compensation (mo comp), inverse discrete cosine transform (iDCT), VLD (variable-length decoding) and deblocking for MPEG-1, MPEG-2, MPEG-4 ASP (MPEG-4 Part 2), H.264/MPEG-4 AVC and VC-1, WMV3/WMV9 encoded videos. Which specific codecs of these that can be offloaded to the GPU depends on the generation version of the GPU hardware.

== History ==
VDPAU was originally designed by Nvidia for their PureVideo SIP block present on their GeForce 8 series and later GPUs.

On March 9, 2015, Nvidia released VDPAU version 1.0 which supports High Efficiency Video Coding (HEVC) decoding for the Main, Main 4:4:4, Main Still Picture, Main 10, and Main 12 profiles.

== Device drivers and video controllers implementing VDPAU ==
VDPAU is implemented in X11 software device drivers, but relies on acceleration features in the hardware GPU. All Nvidia graphic cards for which the driver implements VDPAU are listed in Nvidia PureVideo. S3 Graphics added VDPAU to the Linux drivers of their Chrome 400 video cards. As of version 14.02.17 of its Linux device driver, VDPAU is available with the S3 Chrome 430 GT, S3 Chrome 440 GTX, S3 Chrome 530 GT and the S3 Chrome 540 GTX hardware. ATI/AMD released an open source driver for Radeon HD 4000+ graphic cards featuring VDPAU acceleration. Intel does not offer VDPAU drivers, they only support their VA-API. It is, however, possible to use Intel's VA-API drivers by way of libvdpau-va-gl. Nvidia hopes other GPU designers will make their products compatible with the open source VDPAU library and provide drivers with VDPAU acceleration by mentioning example names of hardware specific drivers for Intel and ATI: libvdpau_intel.so and libvdpau_ati.so. Intel has stated they are considering VDPAU. sunxi SoCs (Allwinner) have experimental VDPAU implementation. Mesa as of v8.0 includes VDPAU for video cards that utilize Gallium3D.

=== Generic VDPAU driver ===
As of late 2013, there is an independently developed back-end driver that in turn uses OpenGL (for drawing and scaling), and VA-API if available (for decoding). It has been reported to work on some Intel graphics and Adobe Flash Player.

The accelerated scaling with just OpenGL functionality is needed mostly because of Flash player, which uses un-accelerated scaling if VDPAU is unavailable. Almost all other video software that runs on Linux or FreeBSD supports Xv. It's essential for full-screen video on slower computers without native VDPAU support.

The VDPAU to VA-API translation for HW decoding is useful with recent Intel graphics hardware, as some software supports HW decoding through VDPAU but not VA-API.

== Software that supports VDPAU ==
- Avidemux as of version 2.6
- Boxee
- FFmpeg
- GStreamer
- Fluendo
- MPlayer
- MythTV
- Kodi (formerly XBMC)
- Xine
- MLT
- Adobe Flash 10.2 Stage Video and later versions
- VLC media player 2.1
- mpv

VDPAU can also be used as a backend for VA-API and OpenMAX IL, which themselves cover a subset of the VDPAU capabilities; so any software that uses the VA-API or OpenMAX IL is also partly capable of using VDPAU (e.g., VLC media player).

== Nvidia VDPAU Feature Sets ==
Nvidia VDPAU Feature Sets are different hardware generations of GPU's supporting different levels of (Nvidia PureVideo) hardware decoding capabilities. For feature sets A, B and C, the maximum video width and height are 2048 pixels, minimum width and height 48 pixels, and all codecs are currently limited to a maximum of 8192 macroblocks (8190 for VC-1/WMV9). Partial acceleration means that VLD (bitstream) decoding is performed on the CPU, with the GPU only performing IDCT, motion compensation and deblocking. Complete acceleration means that the GPU performs all of VLD, IDCT, motion compensation and deblocking.

Feature Set A
Supports complete acceleration for H.264 and partial acceleration for MPEG-1, MPEG-2, VC-1/WMV9.
Feature Set B
Supports complete acceleration for MPEG-1, MPEG-2, VC-1/WMV9 and H.264.
Note that all Feature Set B hardware cannot decode H.264 for the following widths: 769-784, 849-864, 929-944, 1009-1024, 1793-1808, 1873-1888, 1953-1968, 2033-2048 pixels.
Feature Set C
Supports complete acceleration for MPEG-1, MPEG-2, MPEG-4 Part 2 (a.k.a. MPEG-4 ASP), VC-1/WMV9 and H.264.
Global motion compensation and Data Partitioning are not supported for MPEG-4 Part 2.
Feature Set D
Similar to feature set C but added support for decoding H.264 with a resolution of up to 4032 × 4080 and MPEG-1/MPEG-2 with a resolution of up to 4032 × 4048 pixels.
Feature Set E
Similar to feature set D but added support for decoding H.264 with a resolution of up to 4096 × 4096 and MPEG-1/MPEG-2 with a resolution of up to 4080 × 4080 pixels. GPUs with VDPAU feature set E support an enhanced error concealment mode which provides more robust error handling when decoding corrupted video streams.
Feature Set F
Introduced dedicated HEVC Main (8-bit), Main 10 (10-bit) and VP9 Profile 0 (8-bit) video decoding up to 4096 × 2304 pixels resolution.
Feature Set G
Hardware support for HEVC Main 12 (12-bit) and VP9 Profile 2 (12-bit) video decoding are added.
Feature Set H
Feature Set H are capable of hardware-accelerated decoding of 8192x8192 (8k resolution) H.265/HEVC video streams.
Feature Set I
Similar to feature set H.
Feature Set J
Feature Set J adds HEVC 444 decode support.
Feature Set K
Feature Set K are capable of hardware-accelerated decoding of 8192x8192 (8k resolution) AV1 MAIN Profile video streams.

== libvdpau standalone VDPAU library ==
The libvdpau standalone VDPAU library is distributed by Nvidia independently of their proprietary Linux graphics driver in an effort to help the adoption of VDPAU by those outside of Nvidia. This open source library package contains a wrapper library and a debugging library allowing other manufacturers to implement VDPAU in their device drivers.

== See also ==
- PureVideo
- Unified Video Decoder
- DirectX Video Acceleration (DXVA) – the VDPAU equivalent API for Microsoft Windows operating-system.
- Video Acceleration API (VA API) – an alternative video acceleration API for Linux/UNIX operating-system.
- X-Video Bitstream Acceleration (XvBA) – an alternative video acceleration API for Linux/UNIX operating-system.
- X-Video Motion Compensation (XvMC) API – alternative and oldest video acceleration API for Linux/UNIX operating-system.
- Distributed Codec Engine (libcde) is a Texas Instruments API for the video codec engine in OMAP based embedded systems
- Video Decode Acceleration Framework is Apple Inc.'s API for hardware-accelerated decoding of H.264 on Mac OS X
- VideoToolbox is an API from Apple Inc. for hardware-accelerated decoding on Apple TV and Mac OS X.
- OpenMAX IL (Open Media Acceleration Integration Layer) - a royalty-free cross-platform media abstraction API from the Khronos Group
