= X video =

X video may refer to:

- A porn video
- X video extension, a video output mechanism for the X Window System
  - X-Video Motion Compensation, an extension of the above extension

== See also ==
- XVideos, a pornographic video sharing website
- Xvid, a free and open source video codec library
