= PP7 =

PP7 may refer to:

- PP7 battery, a 9-volt battery much larger than the PP3 commonly used in smoke detectors
- PP7, a weapon used in the video game GoldenEye 007 based on the Walther PPK German police pistol
- Patrick Peterson (born 1990), American football player
- Puyo Puyo 7, a video game by SEGA
- pp7, a deblocking filter from the mplayer and later also ffmpeg project
