= OMX (disambiguation) =

OMX was a former name of the Nasdaq Nordic stock exchange group.

OMX may also refer to:

- The stock symbol for OfficeMax
- OpenMAX, a cross-platform set of C-language programming interfaces
- The ISO 639-3 code for the Old Mon language
