= Distributed Codec Engine =

libdce
- Repository: github.com/robclark/libdce
- Written in: C
- Operating system: Unix-like
- Type: Library
- License: Revised BSD License and some additional terms
- Website: github.com/robclark/libdce

The TI Ducati SIP core does video acceleration and accelerated image processing. The actual IC doing the calculations is controlled by software running on two Cortex-M3 microcontrollers. The operating system (running on the host CPU) only needs a shim to interface with the subsystem.

Distributed Codec Engine (DCE) is an API and its implementation as software library ("libdce") by Texas Instruments. The library was released under the Revised BSD License and some additional terms.

It enables and provides remote access to hardware acceleration for audio and video decoding on the IVA-HD in OMAP4-based platforms via a syslink/rcm shim layer accessing the OMAP's Codec Engine API codec interface on the co-processor (Ducati/M3) from the host under Linux without needing OpenMAX. The "Ducati subsystem" comprises two ARM Cortex-M3 processors (CPUs), and the ASICs IVA-HD and ISS.

== Software supporting DCE ==
GStreamer uses the ASICs of Ducati

- gst-ducati, a GStreamer plugin for OMAP4 using libdce
- omapfbplay, a video player for OMAP using Video4Linux (V4L)

== See also ==
- OMAP SoC hardware by Texas Instruments that supports libdce
- Video Acceleration API (VA API) – an alternative video acceleration API for Linux/UNIX operating-system.
- VDPAU (Video Decode and Presentation API for Unix)
- X-Video Bitstream Acceleration (XvBA)
- X-Video Motion Compensation (XvMC)
- DirectX Video Acceleration (DxVA) API - Microsoft Windows analogue
- Video Decode Acceleration Framework is Apple Inc.s API for hardware-accelerated decoding of H.264 on macOS
- VideoToolbox is an API from Apple Inc. for hardware-accelerated decoding on Apple TV and macOS
- OpenVideo Decode (OVD) – a new open cross-platform video acceleration API from AMD.
- OpenMAX IL (Open Media Acceleration Integration Layer) - a royalty-free cross-platform media abstraction API from the Khronos Group
- Nvidia PureVideo - the bit-stream technology from NVIDIA used in their graphics chips to accelerate video decoding on hardware GPU.
- UVD (Unified Video Decoder) - the bit-stream technology from ATI Technologies used in their graphics chips to accelerate video decoding on hardware GPU.

== License ==
It uses a custom vanity license. It does not use an established free open source software license.
