= OpenMAX =

- Developer: Khronos Group
- Website: www.khronos.org/openmax/

OpenMAX (Open Media Acceleration), often shortened as "OMX", is a non-proprietary and royalty-free cross-platform set of C-language programming interfaces. It provides abstractions for routines that are especially useful for processing of audio, video, and still images. It is intended for low power and embedded system devices (including smartphones, game consoles, digital media players, and set-top boxes) that need to efficiently process large amounts of multimedia data in predictable ways, such as video codecs, graphics libraries, and other functions for video, image, audio, voice and speech.

OpenMAX provides three layers of interfaces: application layer (AL), integration layer (IL) and development layer (DL). OpenMAX is managed by the non-profit technology consortium Khronos Group.

== History ==
Initially announced in July 2004. The OpenMAX Working Group was initially founded by members ARM, Motorola, Samsung, STMicroelectronics, and Texas Instruments. Version 1.0 of the specification was published in December 2005. The last draft produced by the OpenMAX Working Group (1.2.0) dates from 2011 and no product has been declared as conformant since 2012. The OpenMAX specification were never updated to support recent codecs like HEVC or VP9, making Android the de facto source of updates to the OpenMAX IL standard.

== Layers ==
OpenMAX AL is the interface between multimedia applications, such as a media player, and the platform media framework. It allows companies that develop applications to easily migrate their applications to different platforms (customers) that support the OpenMAX AL application programming interface (API).

OpenMAX IL is the interface between media framework, (such as StageFright or MediaCodec API on Android, DirectShow on Windows, FFmpeg or GStreamer on Linux), and a set of multimedia components (such as an audio or video codecs). It allows companies that build platforms (e.g. allowing an implementation of an MP3 player) to easily change components like MP3 decoders and Equalizer effects and buy components for their platform from different vendors.

OpenMAX DL is the interface between physical hardware, such as digital signal processor (DSP) chips, CPUs, GPUs, and software, like video codecs and 3D engines. It allows companies to easily integrate new hardware that supports OpenMAX DL without reoptimizing their low level software.

== Application layer ==
OpenMAX AL
- Developer: Khronos Group
- Stable release: 1.1 / January 18, 2011; 15 years ago
- Operating system: Cross-platform
- Type: API
- License: Various
- Website: www.khronos.org/openmax/

OpenMAX AL accommodates common multimedia application use cases by standardizing a set of representative objects, as well as interfaces on those objects, to control and configure them. The OpenMAX AL API is divided into two profiles: Media Player and Media Player/Recorder. A platform can be compliant to one or both of these profiles by providing all features included in a profile.

It is an application-level, C-language, multimedia API designed for resource-constrained devices. The OpenMAX AL API design puts particular emphasis on ensuring the API is suitable for mobile embedded devices - including basic mobile phones, smart “feature” phones, PDAs and mobile digital music players. Nevertheless, this does not preclude its applicability to other sophisticated media playback and recording devices.

The OpenMAX AL API design devotes particular attention to application-developer friendliness. Its status as an open cross-platform API enables developers to port the same source across multiple devices with minimal effort. Thus OpenMAX AL provides a stable base for application development.

=== Features ===
OpenMAX AL features include:

- Video playback and recording
- Audio playback and recording
- Image capture (camera) and display
- Camera controls
- Radio and RDS
- Basic MIDI playback
- Metadata extraction and insertion

==== Digital TV extension ====
A digital television (DTV) extension specification of OpenMAX AL adds standards-agnostic mobile TV tuning, playback, recording and electronic program guide functionality to OpenMAX AL Multimedia API, as a modular royalty-free, cross-platform C-language API for high-performance digital TV-related applications on mobile and embedded devices. DTV Extension is compatible with all major mobile TV standards (e.g. DVB-H, ISDB-T, T-DMB, etc.), and supports broadcast, unicast and multicast delivery methods for Digital TV.

=== Specification versions ===
- OpenMAX AL 1.0 Provisional Specification - a provisional version, dated 2007-09-02, to facilitate feedback from the community before the final 1.0 release.
- OpenMAX AL 1.0 Specification - dated 2009-06-23
- OpenMAX AL 1.0.1 Specification - dated 2010-03-12
- OpenMAX AL 1.1 Specification - dated 2011-01-18

=== Implementations ===
- Android 4.0 and later exposes OpenMAX AL as part of its NDK (Native Development Kit).
- LIM OpenMAX is an open source implementation of OpenMAX AL and OpenMAX IL for Linux.

=== Comparison with OpenSL ES ===
OpenSL ES (Open Sound Library for Embedded Systems) is another Khronos Group API that also provides an audio library for the same target market as OpenMAX AL, while OpenMAX target the complete multimedia services. OpenSL ES and OpenMAX AL audio subset share the same common architecture and have a few common features:

- Audio playback and recording
- Basic MIDI playback
- Metadata extraction

== Integration layer ==
OpenMAX IL
- Developer: Khronos Group
- Stable release: 1.1.2 / September 15, 2008; 18 years ago
- Preview release: 1.2.0 / November 7, 2011; 14 years ago
- Operating system: Cross-platform
- Type: API
- License: Various
- Website: www.khronos.org/openmax/

The OpenMAX IL API strives to give media components portability across an array of platforms using the C-language. In the OpenMAX IL, components represent individual blocks of functionality. Components can be sources, sinks, codecs, filters, splitters, mixers, or any other data operator. Depending on the implementation, a component could possibly represent a piece of hardware, a software codec, another processor, or a combination thereof.

The interface abstracts the hardware and software architecture in the system. The OpenMAX IL API allows the user to load, control, connect, and unload the individual components. This flexible core architecture allows the Integration Layer to easily implement almost any media use case and mesh with existing graph-based media frameworks. The key focus of the OpenMAX IL API is portability of media components.

The OpenMAX IL API design devotes particular attention to use case flexibility and optimized data transfers between components.

The OpenMAX IL API was chosen as the base for the API to integrate Audio and Video codecs on Android, which has resulted in most SoC vendors shipping a minimal implementation that only supports the subset required by Android. Applications do not use those OpenMAX IL components directly, but only through the Android MediaCodec API. Android's subset of OpenMAX IL with its extensions is now the de facto standard.

In 2011 the provisional version 1.2.0 was released.

=== Implementations ===
- Tizonia is an open source OpenMAX IL implementation for Linux that supports version 1.2.0.
- Bellagio is an open source OpenMAX IL implementation for Linux maintained by STMicroelectronics.
- LIM OpenMAX is an open source implementation of OpenMAX AL and OpenMAX IL for Linux.
- Mesa provides hardware accelerated drivers that can be used with Bellagio or Tizonia.
- Android StageFright, a partial implementation of IL that is the de facto standard.

== Development layer ==
OpenMAX DL
- Developer: Khronos Group
- Stable release: 1.0.2 / December 21, 2007; 18 years ago
- Operating system: Cross-platform
- Type: API
- License: Various
- Website: www.khronos.org/openmax/

The OpenMAX DL API defines a set of low-level multimedia kernels or media processing building blocks. The building blocks might be used to accelerate traditional computational hotspots within standardized media codecs and other integrated media processing engines. The functional scope of the OpenMAX DL interface spans several domains including signal processing and image processing, audio coding, image coding, and video coding.

OpenMAX DL is split into five application domains:

- AC - Audio Codecs (MP3 decoder and AAC decoder components)
- IC - Image Codecs (JPEG components)
- IP - Image Processing (Generic image processing functions)
- SP - Signal Processing (Generic audio processing functions)
- VC - Video Codecs (H.264 and MP4 components)

=== Implementations ===
- Optimized implementations for NEON (for Cortex A8 cores) and SIMD (for ARM11 cores), as well as an ANSI C reference implementation, were previously available from ARM for registered users.
- The OpenMAX API is supported by the PlayStation 3 console.

== Working group ==
The OpenMAX working group was founded alongside sister project OpenVG on July 6, 2004. Promoting members in 2008 were AMD, Apple, ARM, Creative, Dell Inc, Ericsson, Freescale, Imagination Technologies Group plc, Intel, IBM, Motorola, Nokia, Nvidia Corporation, Samsung Electronics Co. Ltd, SK Telecom, Sony Computer Entertainment Inc and Texas Instruments.

== See also ==
- Video Acceleration API (VA API)
- VDPAU (Video Decode and Presentation API for Unix)
- X-Video Bitstream Acceleration (XvBA)
- X-Video Motion Compensation (XvMC)
- DirectX Video Acceleration (DxVA) API - Microsoft Windows analogue
- Distributed Codec Engine (libdce) is a Texas Instruments API for the video codec engine in OMAP based embedded systems
- VideoToolbox is an API from Apple Inc. for hardware-accelerated decoding on Apple TV and Mac OS X.
- OpenVideo Decode (OVD) – a new open cross-platform video acceleration API from AMD.
- Nvidia PureVideo - the bit-stream technology from NVIDIA used in their graphics chips to accelerate video decoding on hardware GPU.
- UVD (Unified Video Decoder) - the bit-stream technology from ATI Technologies used in their graphics chips to accelerate video decoding on hardware GPU.
