= Video Acceleration API =

Open source API for video acceleration

libva
- Original author: Intel
- Release: 2008
- Stable release: 2.24.1 / 8 July 2026; 3 months ago
- Written in: C
- Operating system: Linux, Android, BSD, Windows 10, Windows 11
- Type: API
- License: MIT License
- Website: www.freedesktop.org/wiki/Software/vaapi/
- Repository: github.com/intel/libva

Video Acceleration API (VA-API) is an open source application programming interface that allows applications such as VLC media player or GStreamer to use hardware video acceleration capabilities, usually provided by the graphics processing unit (GPU). It is implemented by the free and open-source library libva, combined with a hardware-specific driver, usually provided together with the GPU driver.

VA-API video decode/encode interface is platform and window system independent but is primarily targeted at Direct Rendering Infrastructure (DRI) in X Window System on Unix-like operating systems (including Linux, FreeBSD, Solaris), and Android, however it can potentially also be used with direct framebuffer and graphics sub-systems for video output. Accelerated processing includes support for video decoding, video encoding, subpicture blending, and rendering.

The VA-API specification was originally designed by Intel for its GMA (Graphics Media Accelerator) series of GPU hardware with the specific purpose of eventually replacing the XvMC standard as the default Unix multi-platform equivalent of Microsoft Windows DirectX Video Acceleration (DxVA) API, but today the API is no longer limited to Intel-specific hardware or GPUs. Other hardware and manufacturers can freely use this open standard API for hardware accelerated video processing with their own hardware without paying a royalty fee.

== Overview ==
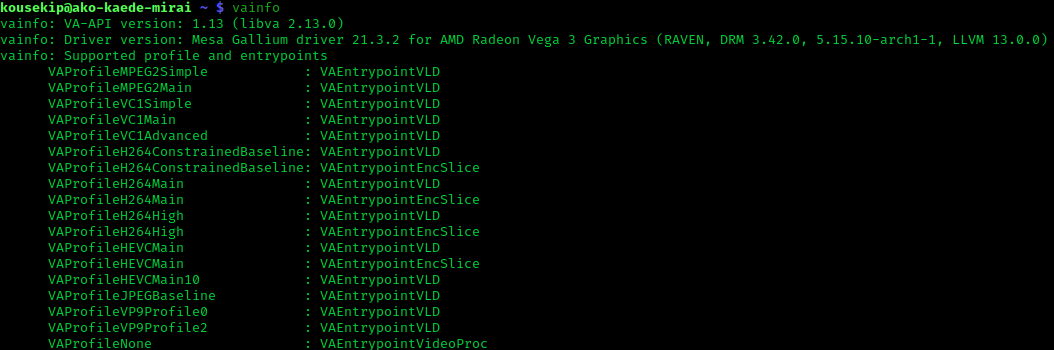
An example of vainfo output, showing supported video codecs for VA-API acceleration

The main motivation for VA-API is to enable hardware-accelerated video decode at various entry-points (VLD, IDCT, motion compensation, deblocking) for the prevailing coding standards today (MPEG-2, MPEG-4 ASP/H.263, MPEG-4 AVC/H.264, H.265/HEVC, and VC-1/WMV3). Extending XvMC was considered, but due to its original design for MPEG-2 MotionComp only, it made more sense to design an interface from scratch that can fully expose the video decode capabilities in today's GPUs.

=== Supported hardware and drivers ===
As of 2022, VA-API is natively supported by:

- Intel Quick Sync open-source drivers for Linux
- Mesa open-source drivers for AMD and Nvidia graphics cards
- AMDGPU-PRO drivers for AMD graphics cards on Linux
- libva-vdpau-driver for cards supported by VDPAU
- Direct3D 12 implementations with the VAOn12 driver

=== Supported video codecs ===
VA-API currently supports these video codecs in the official mainline version, but note that exactly which video codecs are supported depends on the hardware and the driver's capabilities.

- MPEG-2 decode acceleration Main Profile
- VC-1 / WMV3 decode acceleration Advanced Profile
- MPEG-4 Part 2 (H.263) (a.k.a. MPEG-4 SP / MPEG-4 ASP, more commonly known as Xvid) decode acceleration
- H.264 AVC encode acceleration Main Profile
- H.264 AVC decode acceleration High Profile
  - H.264 / AVC Hardware Variable Length Decoding (VLD) - CABAC
  - H.264 / AVC Hardware Variable Length Decoding (VLD) - CAVLC
  - H.264 / AVC Hardware Inverse Transform (IT)
  - H.264 / AVC Hardware Motion Compensation (HWMC)
  - H.264 / AVC Hardware In-Loop Deblocking (ILDB)
- H.265/HEVC encode acceleration
- H.265/HEVC decode acceleration
- VP9 8-bit encode acceleration
- VP9 8-bit and 10-bit decode acceleration
- AV1 8-bit and 10-bit encode acceleration
- AV1 8-bit and 10-bit decode acceleration

== Processes that can be accelerated with VA-API ==
Video decoding and post-processing processes that can be offloaded and accelerated if both the device drivers and GPU hardware supports them:

- Motion compensation
- Inverse discrete cosine transform
- In-loop deblocking filter
- Intra-frame prediction
- variable-length decoding, more commonly known as slice-level acceleration
- Bitstream processing (Context-adaptive variable-length coding/Context-adaptive binary arithmetic coding)

== Software architecture ==
Video Acceleration API architecture

The current interface is window system independent, so that it can potentially be used with graphics sub-systems other than the DRI (Direct Rendering Infrastructure) in X Window System, such as direct with framebuffer, and it can work with third-party DRM (Direct Rendering Manager) libraries. In a nutshell, it is a scheme to pass various types of data buffers from the application to the GPU for decoding or encoding a compressed bit-stream.

== Software supporting VA-API ==
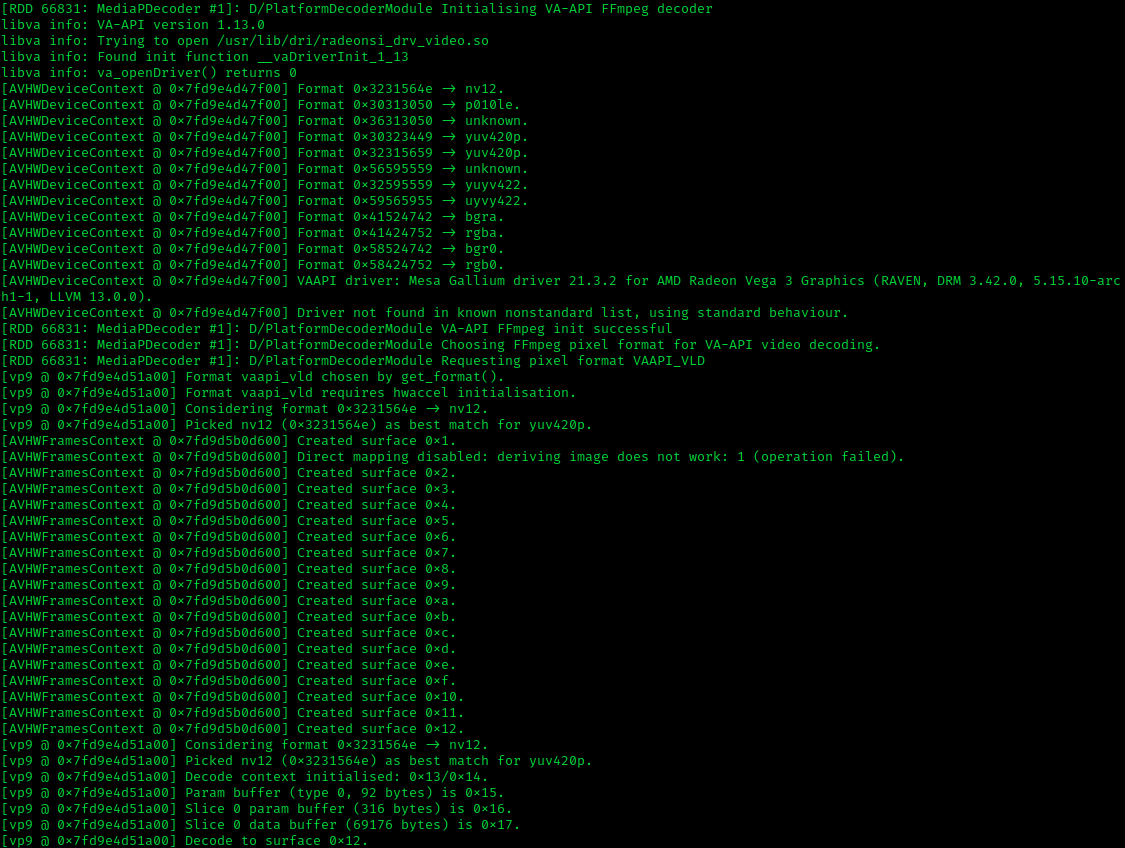
A log of Firefox showing VA-API being used for video decoding acceleration

- Chromium
- Bluecherry DVR client (starting from release 2.2.6)
- datarhei Restreamer real-time live video streaming
- Emby media server (starting from release 3.0.6400)
- ffmpeg, a command line tool from the FFmpeg project (starting from 3.1)
- Firefox (On Wayland since release 78 and on X11 since release 80)
- Fluendo
- Frigate NVR
- Gnash Flash / SWF player
- GStreamer through gstreamer-vaapi
- Helix media player (Linux)
- Jellyfin media server
- Kodi (formerly XBMC Media Center) (Linux)
- Kodibuntu (formerly XBMC Live) (Linux Live CD/USB operating-system)
- libavcodec
- MPlayer with custom patches and its fork mpv (native)
- MythTV (starting from release 0.25)
- OBS Studio
- OpenShot
- VLC media player (starting from release 1.1.0)
- Xine (via "xine-lib-vaapi" library) since Version 1.2.3
- Eranol v1.2.0 (via nextjs)

== See also ==
- Distributed Codec Engine (libdce) — Texas Instruments API for the video codec engine in OMAP based embedded systems
- OpenMAX — a royalty-free cross-platform media abstraction API from the Khronos Group
