= Intel Clear Video =

Intel Clear Video is a semiconductor intellectual property core which implements some steps of some video decompression algorithms. The scope is to calculate these on the SIP core rather than on the CPU. Intel Clear Video is paired with integrated graphics processors branded as Intel GMA.

Intel Clear Video HD is a set of post-processing features added to Intel Clear Video.

== See also ==
- Intel Quick Sync Video – the successor of semiconductor intellectual property core to Intel Clear Video found on newer CPUs
- Nvidia PureVideo
- Unified Video Decoder (UVD)
- Video Coding Engine (VCE)
