= Xgl =

Display server implementation

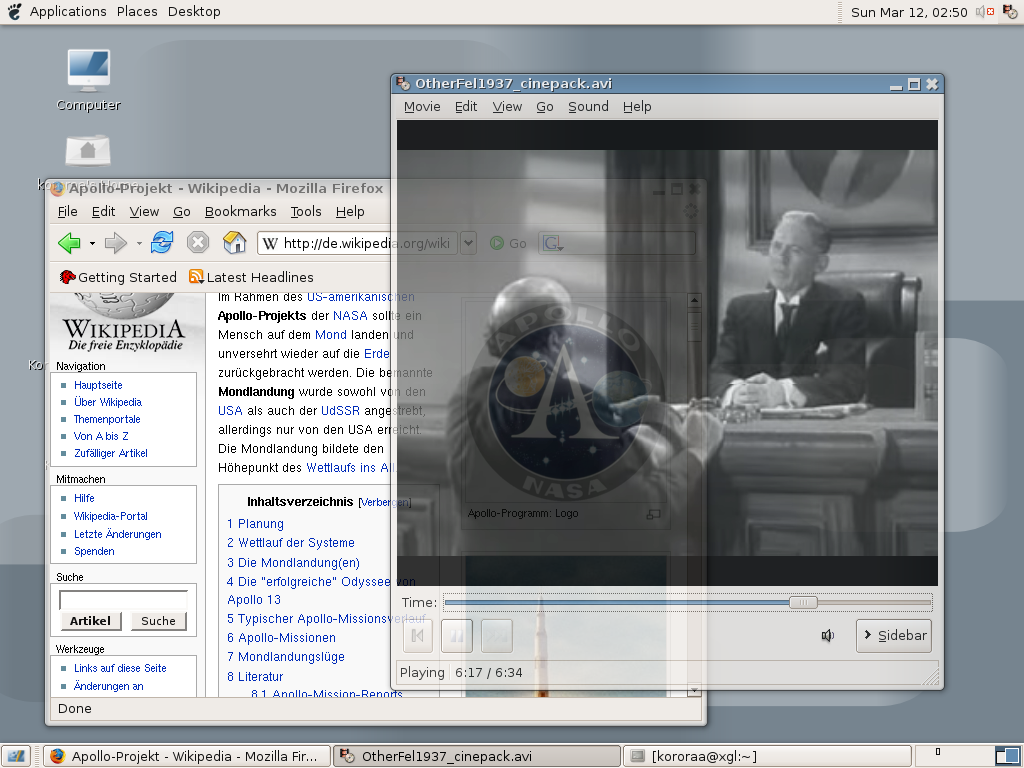
- Compiz on Xgl with real transparency
- Original author(s): David Reveman
- Initial release: January 2, 2006; 19 years ago
- Type: Display server
- Website: web.archive.org/web/20070605230047/http://www.freedesktop.org/wiki/Software/Xgl

Xgl is an obsolete display server implementation supporting the X Window System protocol designed to take advantage of modern graphics cards via their OpenGL drivers, layered on top of OpenGL. It supports hardware acceleration of all X, OpenGL and XVideo applications and graphical effects by a compositing window manager such as Compiz or Beryl. The project was started by David Reveman of Novell and first released on January 2, 2006. It was removed from the X.org server in favor of AIGLX on June 12, 2008.

== History ==
Development of Xgl started in 2004. Until its release in 2006, it was developed in the open on public mailing lists, though during the last few months, development of Xgl was private. On that day, the source to Xgl was re-opened to the public, and included in freedesktop.org, along with major restructuring to allow a wider range of supported display drivers. X server backends used by Xgl include Xglx and Xegl. In February 2006, the server gained wide publicity after a public display where the Novell desktop team demonstrated a desktop using Xgl with several visual effects such as translucent windows and a rotating 3D desktop. The effects had first been implemented in a composite manager called glxcompmgr (not to be confused with xcompmgr), now deprecated because several effects could not be adequately implemented without tighter interaction between the window manager and the composite manager. As a solution, David Reveman developed Compiz, the first proper OpenGL compositing window manager for the X Window System. Later, in September 2006, the Beryl compositing window manager was released as a fork of the original Compiz. Compiz and Beryl have merged back in April 2007, which resulted in the development of Compiz Fusion.

== Backends ==
OpenGL does not specify how to initialize a display and manipulate drawing contexts. Instead, these operations are handled by an API specific to the native windowing system. So far, there are two different backend approaches to solving this initialization problem. Most likely, the majority of each backend will contain the same code, and the differences will primarily be in the initialization portions of the servers.

=== Xglx ===
Xglx was the first backend implemented for this architecture. It requires an already existing X server to run on top of, and uses GLX to create an OpenGL window which Xgl then uses, similar to Xnest. This mode is only intended to be used for development in the future, as it is redundant to require an X server to run Xgl on top of.

At XDevConf 2006 (the 2006 X development conference), NVIDIA made a presentation arguing that this is the wrong direction to take because the layered server abstracts features of the cards away. This makes driver specific capabilities like support for 3D glasses and dual monitor support much more difficult.

However, delegating initialization to an existing X server allows the developers to immediately focus on server functionality rather than dedicating substantial time to specifics of interfacing with numerous video hardware. At the moment, Xglx does not officially support multiple monitors, although it has been achieved on Ubuntu Dapper / ATI / NVIDIA (twinview).

=== Xegl ===
Xegl was a long-term goal of X server development. It shares much of the drawing code with the Xglx server, but the initialization of the OpenGL drawable and context management is handled by the EGL API developed by Khronos (EGL is a window system-independent equivalent to the GLX and WGL APIs, which respectively enable OpenGL support in X and Microsoft Windows). The current implementation uses Mesa-solo to provide OpenGL rendering directly to the Linux framebuffer or DRI to the graphics hardware. As of May 2024, Xegl can only be run using Radeon R200 graphics hardware and development is currently stalled. It is likely that it will remain so until the Xglx server has proven itself and the closed source drivers add support for the EGL API, when it should be a transparent replacement for the nested Xglx server.

== Rationale ==
Structuring all rendering on top of OpenGL could potentially simplify video driver development. It removes the artificial separation of 2D and 3D acceleration. This is advantageous as 2D operations are frequently unaccelerated (which is counterintuitive, since 2D is a subset of 3D).

It also removes all driver-dependent code from the X server itself, and allows for accelerated Composite and Render operations independent of the graphics driver.

== Competitors ==
Hardware acceleration of 2D drawing operations has been a common feature of many window systems (including X11) for many years. The novelty of Xgl and similar systems is the use of APIs specifically developed for 3D rendering for accelerating 2D desktop operations. Prior to the adoption of anti-aliased drawing by X11, the use of 3D rendering APIs for 2D desktop rendering was undesirable because such APIs did not make the pixel accurate rendering guarantees that are part of the original X11 protocol definition.

Hardware-accelerated OpenGL window and desktop rendering, limited to using OpenGL for texture composition, has been in use in Mac OS X, in a technology called Quartz Extreme, since Mac OS X v10.2. Quartz 2D Extreme is an enhancement of this feature and more directly comparable to Xgl. Like Xgl, Quartz 2D Extreme brings OpenGL acceleration to all 2D drawing operations (not just desktop compositing) and ships with Mac OS X v10.4, but is disabled by default pending a formal declaration of production-readiness. Core Animation is the extension of this effort for Leopard (Mac OS X v10.5).

Several desktop interfaces based on 3D APIs have been developed, more recently OpenCroquet and Sun Microsystems's Project Looking Glass ; these take advantage of 3D acceleration for software built within their own framework, but do not appear to accelerate existing 2D desktop applications rendered within their environment (often via mechanisms like VNC).

Microsoft developed a similar technology based on DirectX, named the DWM, as part of its Windows Vista operating system. This technology was first shown publicly at Microsoft's October 2003 PDC.

== Availability ==
As of May 2006, the Xgl X Server (and related components including the Compiz compositing manager and associated graphical config tools) ships as a non-default in one major Linux distribution, SUSE 10.1, and is included in Frugalware Linux or SUSE Linux Enterprise Desktop 10. Xgl can be set up fairly easily for Ubuntu 6.06 LTS (Dapper Drake) and 6.10 (Edgy Eft) and for Freespire with binary packages from unofficial repositories. Xgl is also available as an overlaid package in Gentoo Linux, and as a PKGBUILD for Arch Linux.

Mandriva Linux 2007 includes official packages to run Compiz, using Xgl and AIGLX. Mandriva provides drak3d, a tool to configure a 3D Desktop in two clicks.

Ubuntu 6.10 "Edgy Eft" and later use AIGLX, not Xgl, by default.

Xgl was removed from X11R7.5 in 2009 due to it being an unmaintained server variant.

== See also ==
- X Window System
- AIGLX
- VirtualGL
- OpenGL
- Compiz
- Beryl
