= WGL (API) =

WGL or Wiggle is an API between OpenGL and the windowing system interface of Windows. WGL is analogous to EGL, which is an interface between rendering APIs such as OpenCL, OpenGL, OpenGL ES or OpenVG and the native platform, as well as to CGL, which is the OS X interface to OpenGL.

== See also ==
- CGL – the equivalent OS X interface to OpenGL
- GLX – the equivalent X11 interface to OpenGL
- EGL – a similar interface between to OpenGL ES and OpenVG and a windowing system; used by Wayland
- GLUT – a higher level interface that hides the differences between WGL, GLX, etc.
