= Composite Extension =

Extension for X Window System

The Composite Extension of the X Window System renders the graphical output of clients "...to an off-screen buffer. Applications can then take the contents of that buffer and do whatever they like. The off-screen buffer can be automatically merged into the parent window or merged by external programs, called compositing managers."

This enabled the creation of compositing managers for X, capable of effects like transparency, 3D rotation, and jiggly windows.

The composite extension was added to X.org in version X11R6.8 in September 2004.
