= Utah GLX =

Utah GLX parallel to 2D drivers. Only indirect rendering over GLX is possible.

Utah GLX was a project aimed at creating a fully free and open-source basic hardware-accelerated 3D renderer using the OpenGL rendering API on Linux kernel-based operating systems. Utah GLX predates Direct Rendering Infrastructure, which is what is used as of 2014.

John Carmack worked on Utah GLX.

== History ==
2D drivers inside of the X server

Indirect rendering over GLX, using Utah GLX

Early Direct Rendering Infrastructure

Finally all access goes through the Direct Rendering Manager.

In Linux kernel 3.12 render nodes were merged and the KMS driver was split off. Wayland implements direct rendering over EGL/GBM.
