= Picom =

Standalone compositor for Linux

Picom is a lightweight standalone compositor created for the X Window System. It is a fork of compton, created because compton wasn't being actively maintained; compton is, in turn, a fork of xcompmgr-dana, forked from xcompmgr.

== Configuration ==
Picom can be configured using a config file which in most systems is located at $XDG_CONFIG_HOME/picom.conf. However, picom can also be started with a custom config file using the following options:

picom --config ~/.config/picom/picom.conf

== Usages ==
Picom has multiple configurations in which it can be run, however in most instances, when using it in conjunction with another window manager, the -b flag is used to start it as a background process.

== See also ==
- Shui, Yuxuan (2023-05-20), picom
