= Graphics hardware =

Hardware generating and displaying computer graphics

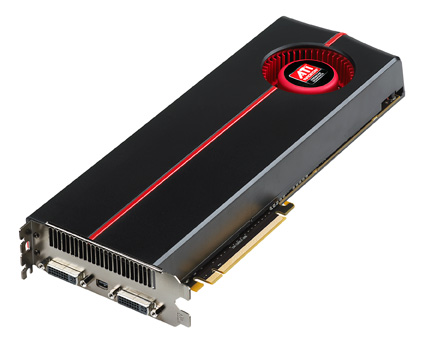
A graphics card

Graphics hardware is computer hardware that generates computer graphics and allows them to be shown on a display, usually using a graphics card (video card) in combination with a device driver to create the images on the screen.

== Types ==
=== Graphics cards ===
The most important piece of graphics hardware is the graphics card, which is the piece of equipment that renders out all images and sends them to a display. There are two types of graphics cards: integrated and dedicated. An integrated graphics card, usually by Intel to use in their computers, is bound to the motherboard and shares RAM (Random Access Memory) with the CPU, reducing the total amount of RAM available. This is undesirable for running programs and applications that use a large amount of video memory. A dedicated graphics card has its own RAM and Processor for generating its images and does not slow down the computer. Dedicated graphics cards also have higher performance than integrated graphics cards. It is possible to have both dedicated and integrated graphics, however once a dedicated graphics card is installed, the integrated card will no longer function until the dedicated card is removed.

==== Parts of a graphics card ====
The GPU, or graphics processing unit, is the unit that allows the graphics card to function. It performs a large amount of the work given to the card. The majority of video playback on a computer is controlled by the GPU. Once again, a GPU can be either integrated or dedicated.

Video Memory is built-in RAM on the graphics card, which provides it with its own memory, allowing it to run smoothly without taking resources intended for general use by the rest of the computer. The term "Video" here is an informal designation and is not intended in a narrow sense. In particular, it does not imply exclusively video data. The data in this form of memory comprises all manner of graphical data including those for still images, icons, fonts, and generally anything that is displayed on the screen. In Integrated graphics cards, which lack this built-in memory, the main memory available for general computation is used instead, which means less memory for other functions of the system.

=== Display drivers ===
A display driver is a piece of software which allows your graphics hardware to communicate with your operating system. Drivers in general allow your computer to utilize parts of itself, and without them, the machine would not function. This is because a graphics device usually communicates in its own language, which is more sophisticated, and a computer communicates in its own language, which largely deals with general commands. Therefore, a driver is required to translate between the two, and convert general commands into specific commands, and vice versa, so that each of the devices can understand the instructions and results. Every card needs its own driver, although some drivers include the driver for several cards. Ex. a GTX1060 driver will not work in a Radeon card.

== Installation ==
Dedicated graphics cards are not bound to the motherboard, and therefore most are removable, replaceable, or upgradable. They are installed in an expansion slot and connected to the motherboard. On the other hand, an integrated graphics card cannot be changed without buying a new motherboard with a better chip, as they are bound to the motherboard.

Also, if an integrated graphics card gets damaged or ceases to function, a new motherboard must be purchased to replace it, as it is bound to the motherboard and cannot be removed or replaced. On the other hand, if there is a problem with a dedicated graphics card, it can be replaced by installing another.

Drivers for the hardware are installed through software downloaded or provided by the manufacturer. Each brand of graphics hardware has its own drivers that are required for the hardware to run appropriately.

== Brands ==
The major competing brands in graphics hardware are NVidia and AMD. NVidia is known largely in the computer graphics department due to its GeForce brand, whereas AMD is known due to its Radeon brand. These two brands account for largely 100 percent of the graphics hardware market, with NVidia making 4 billion dollars in revenue and AMD generating 6.5 billion in revenue (through all sales, not specifically graphics cards).

Radeon used to be ATI, until AMD bought ATI for $5.4 billion in 2006. ATI cards are no longer produced, and Radeon is now part of AMD

More recently, Intel has released its Iris graphics, adding a 3rd competitor to the market.

== Costs ==
The price of graphics hardware varies with its power and speed. Most high-end gaming hardware are dedicated graphics cards that cost from $200 up to the price of a new computer. In the graphics cards department, using integrated chips is much cheaper than buying a dedicated card, however the performance conforms to the price.

Also, computer graphics hardware usually generates a larger amount of heat, especially high end gaming pieces, and requires additional cooling systems to prevent overheating. This may further raise the cost, although some dedicated graphics cards come with built-in fans.

== See also ==
- Graphics hardware and FOSS
