= Metisse =

Windowing software for X

- Type: Desktop environment
- License: GNU General Public License
- Website: insitu.lri.fr/metisse

Metisse is a 2.5D X window manager with many features that set it apart from the traditional 3D "cube" workspace. Windows can be turned three-dimensionally in any direction, enabling the user to fit more windows onto a screen, and they can be scaled, all while remaining fully operational. The development team has avoided such effects as wobbly windows, giving functionality and productivity higher priority than eye candy.

Metisse was available for Mandriva One 2007, PCLinuxOS 2007, Sabayon Linux, Arch Linux, and other Linux distributions, as well as FreeBSD, and Mac OS X.

Metisse is free and open-source software subject to the terms of the GNU General Public License (GPL).

== See also ==
- Project Looking Glass
- BumpTop
- 3D desktop environment
