= Ubuntu Cinnamon =

Derivative of the Ubuntu operating system, utilizing the Cinnamon desktop environment

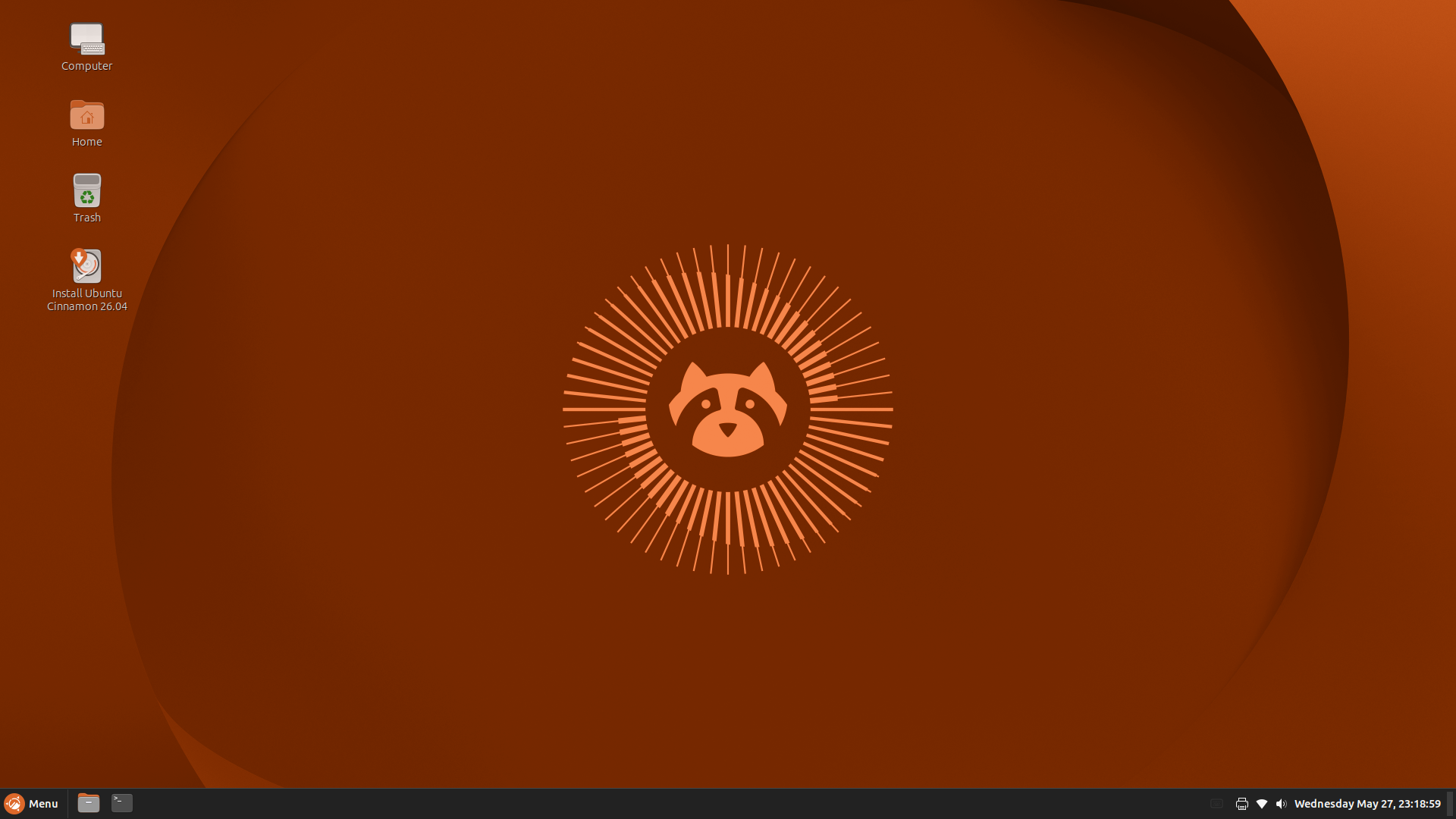
- Ubuntu Cinnamon 26.04 LTS "Resolute Raccoon"
- Developer: Joshua Peisach
- OS family: Linux (Unix-like)
- Working state: Current
- Source model: Open-source software
- Initial release: December 4, 2019; 6 years ago
- Latest release: 26.10 ("Stonking Stingray") / October 15, 2026; 4 days ago
- Repository: github.com/ubuntucinnamon
- Package manager: APT
- Kernel type: Monolithic (Linux)
- Userland: GNU
- Default user interface: Cinnamon
- License: GNU GPL
- Official website: ubuntucinnamon.org

Ubuntu Cinnamon is a community-driven, free and open-source Linux distribution based on Ubuntu, using the Cinnamon desktop environment in place of Ubuntu's GNOME Shell. The first release was 19.10 'Eoan Ermine' on December 4, 2019, and was the first official distribution to use Ubuntu with the Cinnamon desktop. Ubuntu Cinnamon Remix is also used synonymously to reference the project.

== History ==
The Cinnamon environment was developed by the Linux Mint team in 2011 and was first used as the default desktop environment in Linux Mint 13. Ideas to combine Ubuntu and Cinnamon were not new, and had been floated around several times before the project. However, the idea was never developed significantly.

In 2019, user ItzSwirlz posted on Ubuntu Discourse requesting info on a Cinnamon Ubuntu flavor. He stepped up to build the project, and the first release was released later that year on SourceForge.

=== Flavor Status ===
As early as 2020, Peisach expressed interest in attaining flavor status for Ubuntu Cinnamon Remix.

In 2022, Peisach emailed the Ubuntu Technical Board requesting official flavor status. In the Ubuntu Technical Board meeting over IRC on March 28, 2023, Ubuntu Cinnamon was officially deemed a flavor by Ubuntu.

== Releases ==
=== Release 19.10 ===
19.10 "Eoan Ermine" was the first stable Ubuntu Cinnamon release, then referred to as Ubuntu Cinnamon Remix. It was released on December 4, 2019. It featured a Calamares Installer, with Kimmo themes.

=== Release 20.04 LTS ===
20.04 "Focal Fossa" was the first stable Ubuntu Cinnamon LTS release. In addition to bug fixes, it contained mostly graphical updates, with updates to animation, customization, and layout.

- Point release 20.04.1 was released on August 6, 2020. The update featured a few more design and customization options, the most prominent being the artwork changes.
- Point release 20.04.2 was released on February 4, 2021. The update mainly featured bug fixes.
- Point release 20.04.3 was released on August 26, 2021. The update featured security patches in addition to regular bug fixes.
- Point release 20.04.4 was released on February 25, 2022. The update featured no updates specific to Ubuntu Cinnamon, and instead just reflected Ubuntu's updates.
- Point release 20.04.5 was released on September 1, 2022.

=== Release 20.10 ===
20.10 "Groovy Gorilla" was a standard release on October 22, 2020. The version featured a replacement of Cinnamon sounds with Ubuntu sounds, and further design changes. Cinnamon was upgraded to version 4.6.6 in the update, which came with better monitor support as well as layout improvements.

=== Release 21.04 ===
21.04 "Hirsute Hippo" was a standard release on April 24, 2021. This version mainly consisted of updates to the Nemo file manager and Cinnamon. They were updated to versions 4.8.5 and 4.8.6 respectively. Developer Joshua Peisach stated his "planning for the future of UCR" as a reason for the lack of major updates.

=== Release 21.10 ===
21.10 "Impish Indiri" was a standard release on October 14, 2021. The version contained updates for linux developers and a key kernel update. Linux Kernel was updated to version 5.13, adding support for newer graphics cards. Default Python, Ruby, PHP, Perl, and the GNU Compiler Collection were updated to newer versions.

=== Release 22.04 LTS ===
22.04 "Jammy Jellyfish" was the second Ubuntu Cinnamon LTS release, on April 22, 2022. This version updated the Cinnamon version to the 5.x series, going to version 5.2.7. Major updates were mostly contained within Ubuntu Cinnamon and not Ubuntu Cinnamon Remix itself.

- Point release 22.04.1 was released on August 14, 2022. The update featured no major improvements and was mainly focused on system stability.

=== Release 22.10 ===
22.10 "Kinetic Kudu" was a standard release on October 20, 2022. The version updated the Cinnamon version to 5.4.12, which added many layout features as well as minor feature updates. Several Cinnamon packages were also updated. A major update was to Cinnamon's windows manager Muffin, which received a code rebase. Aside from operating system updates, this update also featured the addition of Ubuntu Cinnamon created packages to the main Ubuntu archives.

=== Release 23.04 ===
23.04 "Lunar Lobster" was a standard release on April 20, 2023. It is the first release of Ubuntu Cinnamon as an official Ubuntu flavor. This version updated the Cinnamon version to 5.6.7, adding more layout and UI features as well as bug fixes. The Nemo file manager was also updated to version 5.6.3, mainly featuring bug fixes. Muffin was updated to version 5.6.3, also featuring mostly bug fixes.

This update was also the first update available to be downloaded from the actual Ubuntu host, rather than using SourceForge.

=== Release 23.10 ===
23.10 "Mantic Minotaur" was a standard release on October 12, 2023. This version updated the Cinnamon version to 5.8.4, which included UI updates and built-in support for touchscreen gestures. The release also updated Linux kernel version to 6.5, and introduced full disk encryption.

=== Release 24.04 LTS ===
24.04 "Noble Numbat" was the first Ubuntu Cinnamon LTS release as a flavor on April 25, 2024. This version updated the Cinnamon version to 6.0.4, which included various quality of life updates and design tweaks. It also is the first release to use the flutter-based installer.

=== Release 24.10 ===
24.10 "Oracular Oriole" was released on October 10, 2024. This version featured a hybrid of Cinnamon version 6.0.4 and 6.2.0, with only certain features such as the Cinnamon screensaver being updated. Other features such as the Linux Kernel and various apps were also updated universally across all flavors.

=== Release 25.04 ===
25.04 "Plucky Puffin" was released on April 17, 2025. This version featured Cinnamon version 6.4.8, providing various customization updates across the operating system. Various other features were also updated to bring general quality of life updates and bug fixes.

=== Release 25.10 ===
25.10 "Questing Quokka" was released on October 9, 2025. This version featured Cinnamon version 6.4.12, and updates were also made to the Yaru-Cinnamon theme.

=== Release 26.04 LTS ===
26.04 "Resolute Raccoon" was released on April 23, 2026 as Ubuntu Cinnamon's second LTS release as a flavor. This version featured Cinnamon version 6.4.13, and various updates to bundled software programs.

=== Release 26.10 ===
26.10 "Stonking Stingray" was released on October 15, 2026. This version featured Cinnamon version 6.6.9, various quality of life updates, and bug fixes.

== Table of Releases ==
Version	Code name	Release date	End of Support	Remarks
19.10	Eoan Ermine	December 4, 2019	July 2020	First release of Ubuntu Cinnamon
20.04 LTS	Focal Fossa	May 7, 2020	April 2023	LTS version
20.10	Groovy Gorilla	October 22, 2020	July 2021	
21.04	Hirsute Hippo	April 24, 2021	January 2022	
21.10	Impish Indri	October 14, 2021	July 2022	
22.04 LTS	Jammy Jellyfish	April 22, 2022	April 2025	LTS version
22.10	Kinetic Kudu	October 20, 2022	July 2023	
23.04	Lunar Lobster	April 20, 2023	January 2024	First release as a flavor
23.10	Mantic Minotaur	October 12, 2023	July 2024	
24.04 LTS	Noble Numbat	April 25, 2024	April 2027	LTS version
24.10	Oracular Oriole	October 10, 2024	July 2025	
25.04	Plucky Puffin	April 17, 2025	January 2026	
25.10	Questing Quokka	October 9, 2025	July 2026	
26.04 LTS	Resolute Raccoon	April 23, 2026	April 2029	Latest LTS version
26.10	Stonking Stingray	October 15, 2026	July 2027	Latest release
27.04	Tenacious T-Rex	April 22, 2027	January 2028	Future Release
Old version, not maintained Old version, maintained Current version Future Release

== See also ==
- Cinnamon (desktop environment)
- List of Linux Distributions
- Linux Mint
