= MATE (desktop environment) =

Desktop environment forked from GNOME 2

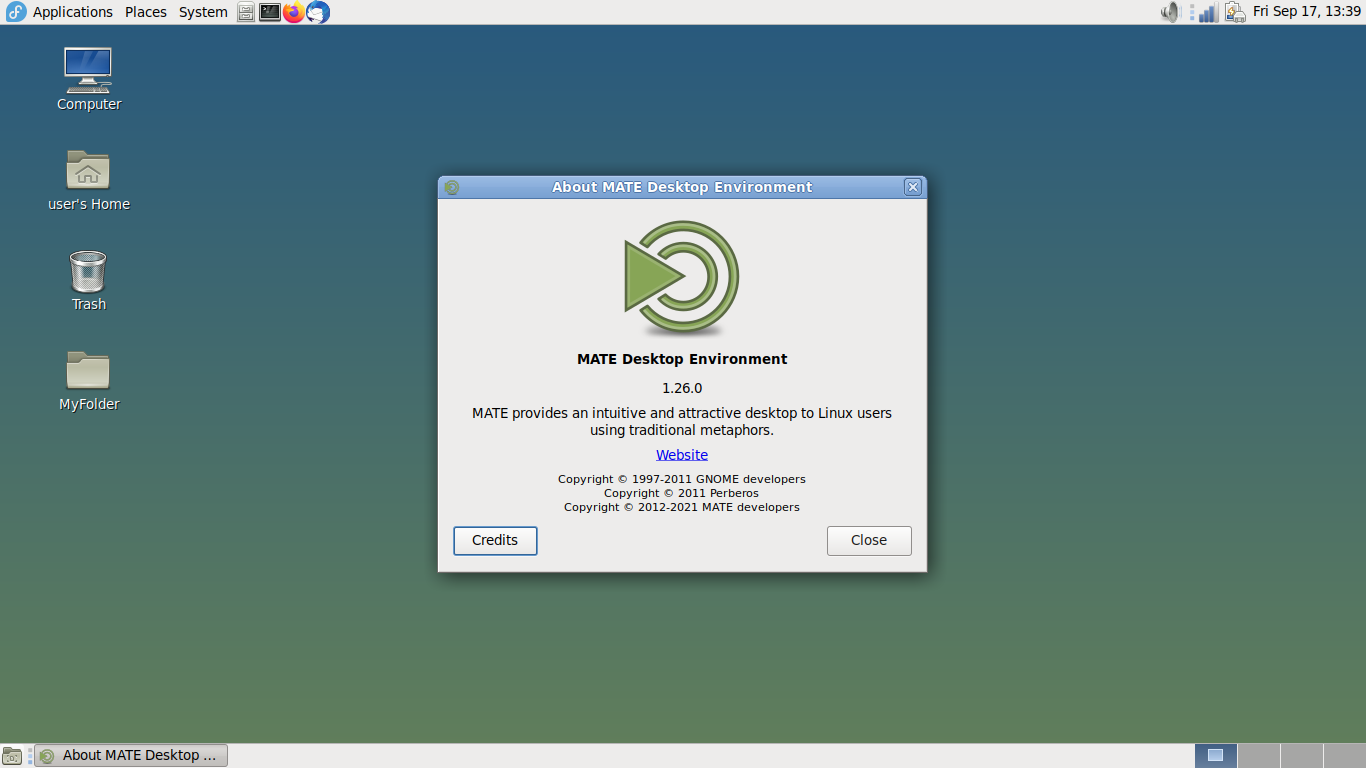
- Fedora Linux with MATE version 1.26
- Developers: Clement Lefebvre, Perberos, Stefano Karapetsas, et al.
- Release: August 19, 2011; 15 years ago
- Stable release: 1.29.0 / 27 May 2026; 4 months ago
- Written in: C
- Operating system: Unix-like, Unix
- Type: Desktop environment
- License: GPLv2+, LGPLv2+
- Website: mate-desktop.org
- Repository: github.com/mate-desktop/mate-desktop

MATE (/ˈmɑːteɪ/ MAH-tay) is a desktop environment composed of free and open-source software that runs on Linux, and other Unix-like operating systems such as BSD, and Illumos.

== Name ==
MATE is named after the South American plant yerba mate and tea made from the herb, mate. The name is stylized in all capital letters to follow the nomenclature of other Free Software desktop environments like KDE Plasma and LXDE. The recursive backronym "MATE Advanced Traditional Environment" was subsequently adopted by most of the MATE community, again in the spirit of Free Software like GNU ("GNU's Not Unix!"). The use of a new name, instead of GNOME, avoids naming conflicts with GNOME components.

== History ==
Perberos, an Argentine user of Arch Linux, started the MATE project to fork and continue GNOME 2 in response to the negative reception of GNOME 3, which had replaced its traditional taskbar (GNOME Panel) with GNOME Shell. MATE aims to maintain and continue the latest GNOME 2 code base, frameworks, and core applications.

MATE was initially announced for Debian on November 8, 2013, at its official website.

MATE became an official Arch Linux community package in January 2014.

== Component applications ==
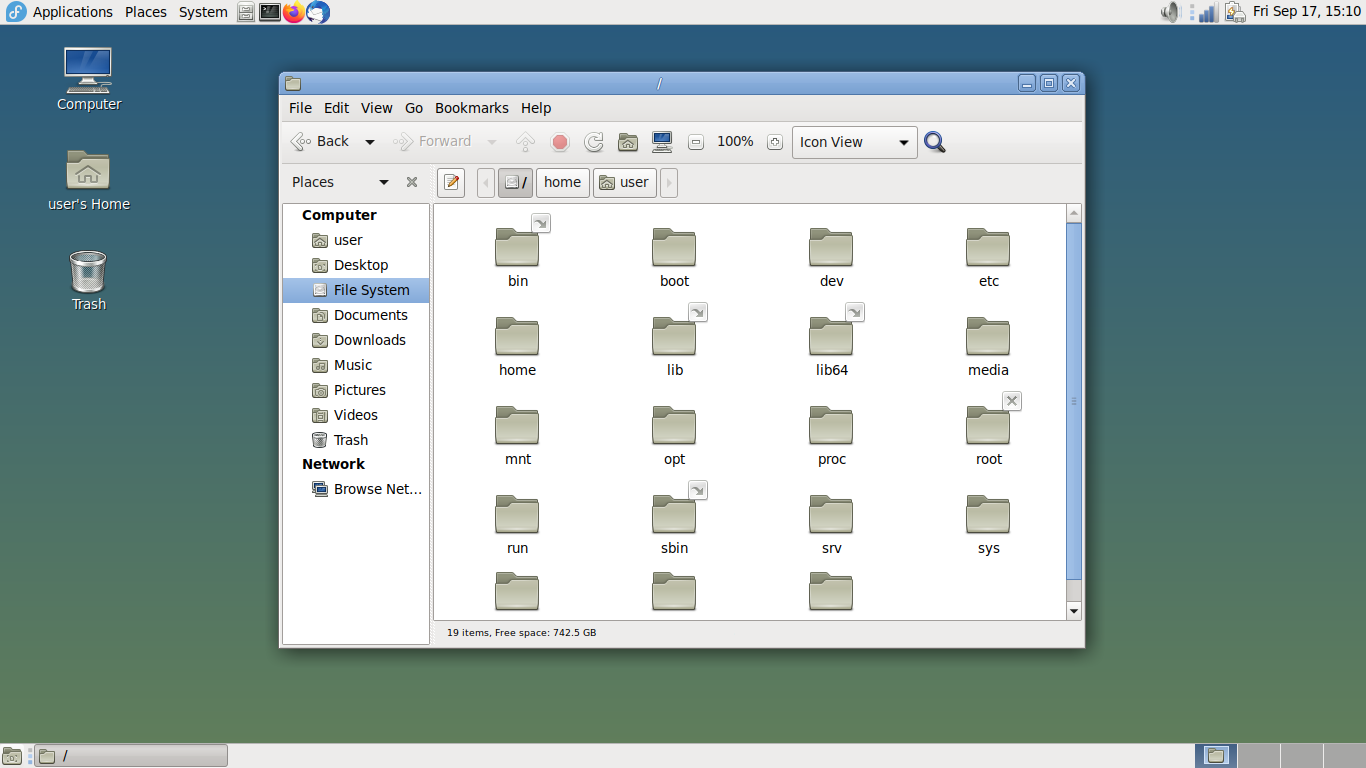
Showing a main component of "Caja" file-manager

MATE has forked a number of applications which originated as GNOME Core Applications, and developers have written several other applications from scratch. The forked applications have new names, most of them from Spanish.

MATE applications
Application name	Spanish translation	Forked from	Description	Features
Atril	lectern	Evince	Document viewer	EPUB support Caret navigation support
Caja	box	GNOME Files (Nautilus)	File Manager	Extension support
Engrampa	staple	Archive Manager (File Roller)	File archiver	
Eye of MATE		Eye of GNOME	Image viewer	
MATE Calculator		GNOME Calculator	Calculator	
MATE Control Center		GNOME Control Center	MATE desktop settings	
MATE System Monitor		GNOME System Monitor	Graphical resource monitor	
MATE Terminal		GNOME Terminal	Terminal emulator	
marco	frame	Metacity	MATE window manager	
Mozo	waiter	Alacarte	Menu editor	
Pluma	pen	Gedit	Text editor	

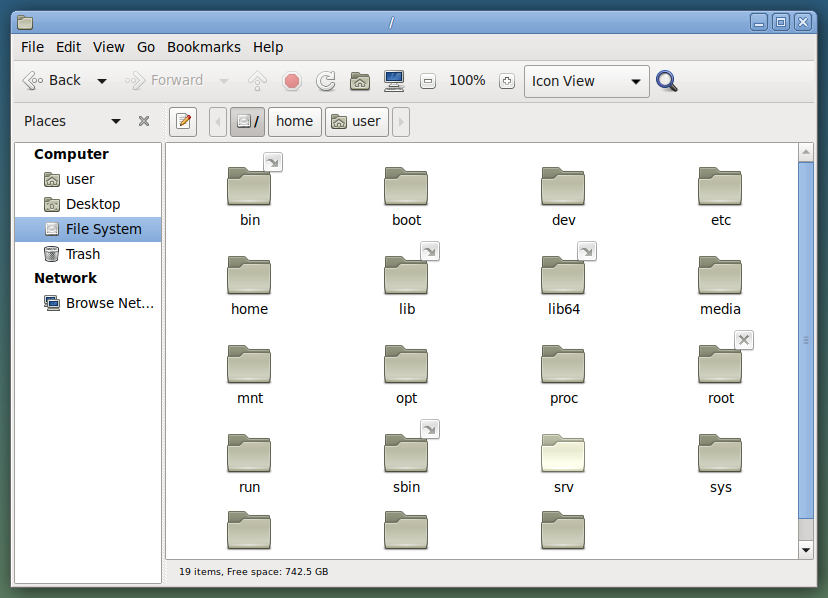
Screenshot of Caja file manager: v.1.26

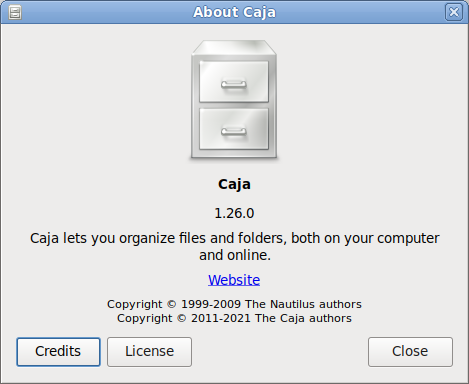
Caja-about, version 1.26

== Development ==
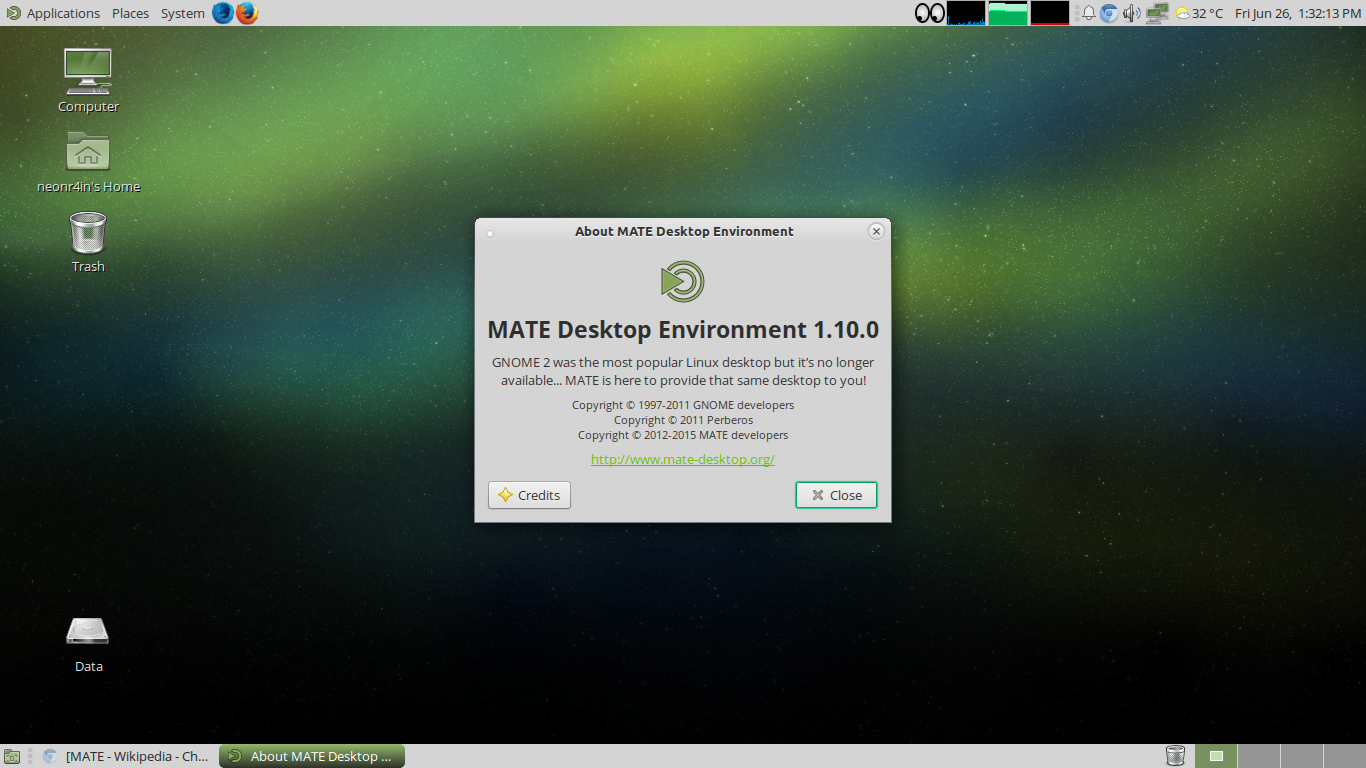
Screenshot of MATE 1.10, GTK3 version, on Manjaro Linux

MATE fully supports the GTK 3 application framework. The project is supported by Ubuntu MATE lead developer Martin Wimpress and by the Linux Mint development team:

We consider MATE yet another desktop, just like KDE, Gnome 3, Xfce etc... and based on the popularity of Gnome 2 in previous releases of Linux Mint, we are dedicated to support it and to help it improve. The most popular Linux desktop was, and arguably is, Gnome 2.

New features have been added to Caja such as undo/redo and diff viewing for file replacements. MATE 1.6 removes some deprecated libraries, moving from mate-conf (a fork of GConf) to GSettings, and from mate-corba (a fork of GNOME's Bonobo) to D-Bus.

One of the aims of the MATE developers is to provide a traditional user experience while using the newest technologies. In MATE 1.20, which was released in February 2018, support for HiDPI was added and the GTK version got increased to 3.22. The MATE 1.22 release migrated many programs from Python 2 to Python 3 and from dbus-glib to GDBus. In an upcoming version, support for Wayland will be added. MATE 1.28.2 had greater support for Wayland, but did not provide a completely seamless fully native Wayland session yet.

== Release history ==
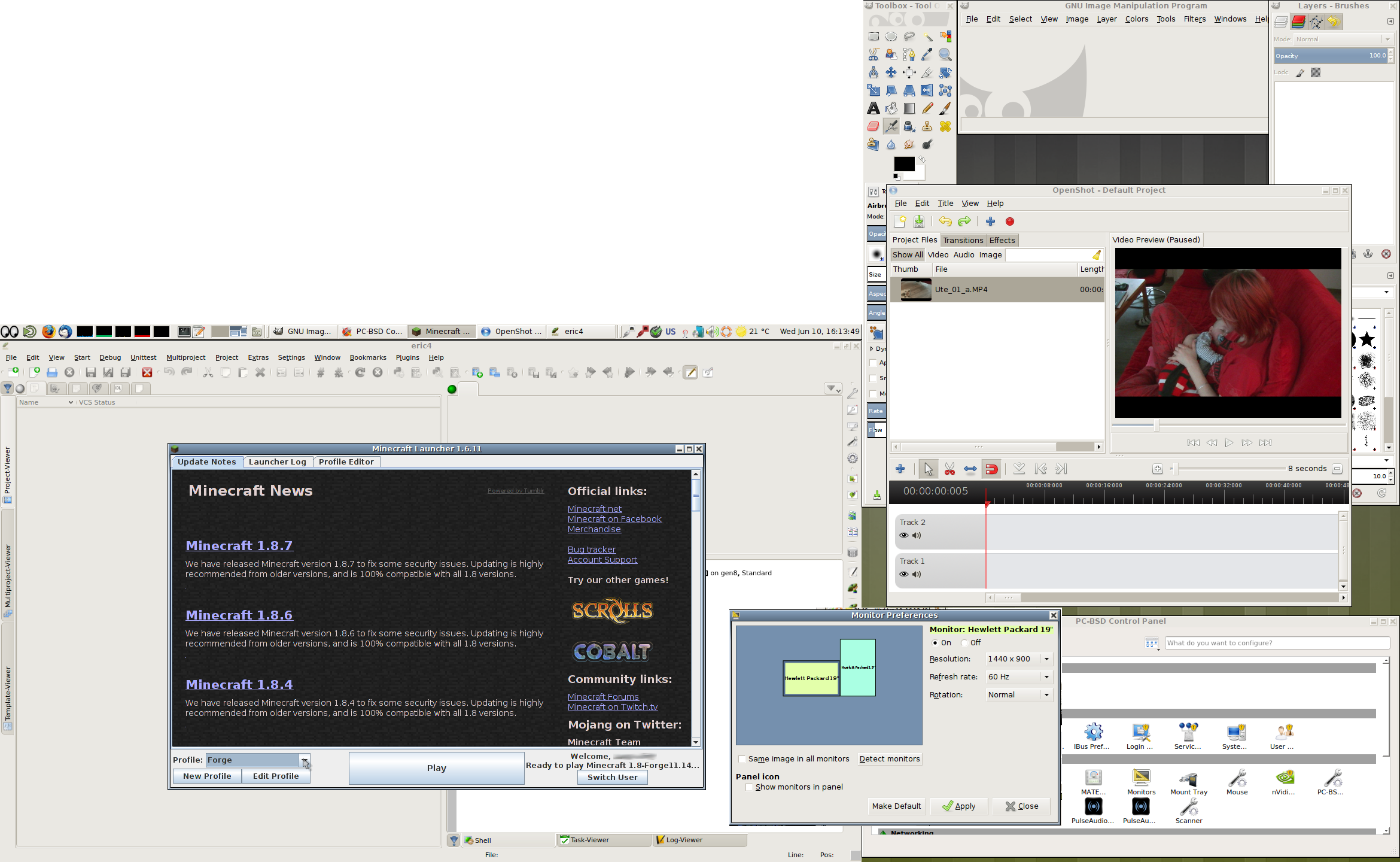
Screenshot of a PC-BSD 10.1.2 desktop (MATE) with dual monitor (dual head, pivot). The running free and open-source (FOSS) programs are: GIMP, OpenShot Video Editor, file manager, Eric Python development IDE. Also shown: Minecraft 1.8.7 (with "Forge" mods).

Note that between each release, development versions are tagged with odd-numbered version numbers. These are not announced as official releases.

Date	Version
2011-06-18	Announced at Arch Linux forum
2011-08-19	Initial release
2012-04-16	1.2
2012-07-30	1.4
2013-04-02	1.6
2014-03-04	1.8
2015-06-11	1.10
2015-11-05	1.12
2016-04-08	1.14
2016-09-21	1.16
2017-03-13	1.18
2018-02-07	1.20
2019-03-18	1.22
2020-02-10	1.24
2021-08-03	1.26
2024-02-12	1.28
2026-05-27	1.29

== Adoption ==
The MATE website lists 27 Linux distributions and 5 Unix-like operating systems that support the MATE desktop environment.

It is available on the official repositories of only 22 of those Linux distributions.

== Reception ==
MATE was praised for having a classic feel, with an "incredibly sharp" default theme and icon pack. In addition, it was praised for being lightweight within the Ubuntu MATE operating system, a version of the Ubuntu desktop that uses MATE as its primary desktop environment.

MATE has been praised for its speed and optimization being used dominantly on older machines. It has also been praised for its massive theming capabilities allowing users to also install themes.

The inclusion of GNOME Shell in GNOME 3 was a controversial decision. The users that preferred GNOME 2 have found MATE to be much more reliable for old-school users.

Beginner users have praised the simplicity of MATE coming from its similarities to the Microsoft Windows operating system, the MATE Welcome app and other factors.

In an article from January 18, 2026 author Dibakar Ghosh makes the case that "MATE is the best Linux desktop environment for retro computing enthusiasts" Performance over animation, designed to use a keyboard and mouse (not touchscreen). a desktop you store files and shortcuts on, and menus that aren't hidden behind 3 dot or hamburger menus. Suited to the person that wants something that is designed to get things done, rather than focused on being visually impressive.

== See also ==
- Budgie
- Cinnamon
- GNOME
- LXDE
- LXQt
- Xfce
