= Gconf-editor =

GNOME desktop utility

gconf-editor
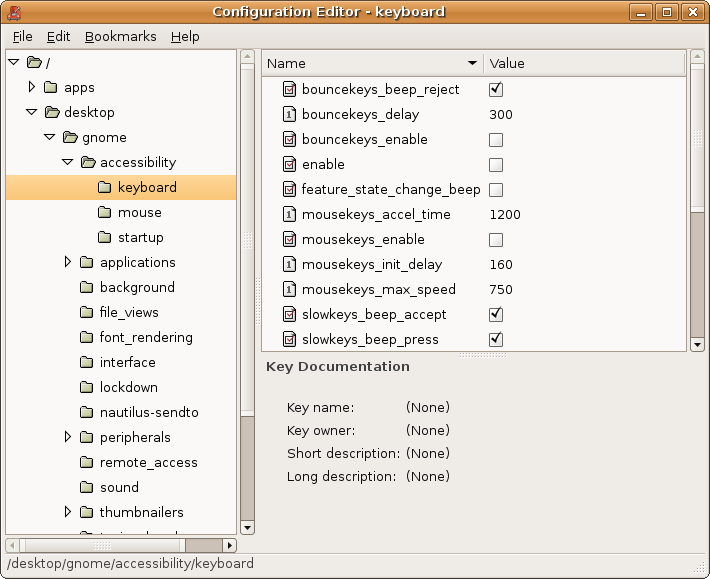
- gconf-editor on Ubuntu
- Final release: 3.0.1 / November 21, 2011; 13 years ago
- Repository: gitlab.gnome.org/Archive/gconf-editor
- Operating system: BSDs, Linux, et al.
- Type: Configuration editor
- License: GNU General Public License
- Website: projects.gnome.org/gconf/

Gconf-editor is a discontinued utility for the GNOME desktop environment used to maintain the old and now discontinued GNOME registry gconf.

Gconf-editor gives users the ability to access settings stored in the XML-based GConf configuration database or registry. It is used primarily by developers to debug applications, or by power users to edit hidden and complex settings. It abstracts the values from the GConf database and presents them in an interface similar to Microsoft Windows' registry editor.

Other gconf tools have also appeared, such as Gconfpref by MandrakeSoft. There are also patches for popular applications, which add the ability to change the hidden options from within the application itself, avoiding the need for gconf-editor.

There is also the dconf-editor for the dconf; dconf has replaced Gconf.
