= Alacarte =

Menu editor for the GNOME desktop

Alacarte Menu Editor
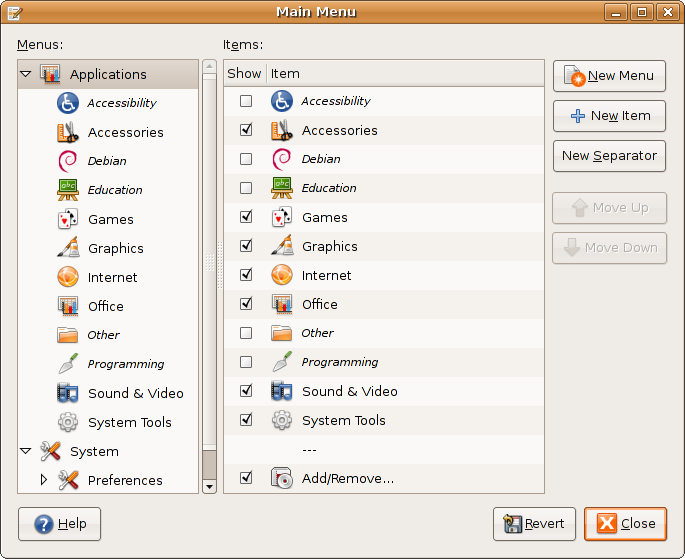
- Screenshot of Alacarte
- Developer(s): Travis Watkins
- Stable release: 3.50.0 / September 23, 2023; 20 months ago
- Repository: gitlab.gnome.org/GNOME/alacarte/
- Operating system: Linux, Solaris, BSD, other Unix-like
- Type: Menu Editor
- License: LGPL
- Website: ftp.gnome.org

Alacarte (previously the Simple Menu Editor for GNOME or SMEG) is a menu editor for the GNOME desktop, written in Python. It has been part of GNOME since the 2.16 release in 2006.

The menu "Places" is not available for editing. The places menu can be edited with the command: $gedit ~/.gtk-bookmarks, or use gconf-editor (e.g. /system/storage/drives/_org_freedesktop_.../mount_options).

An alternative to Alacarte is MenuLibre.
