= Nemo (file manager) =

File manager

Nemo file manager

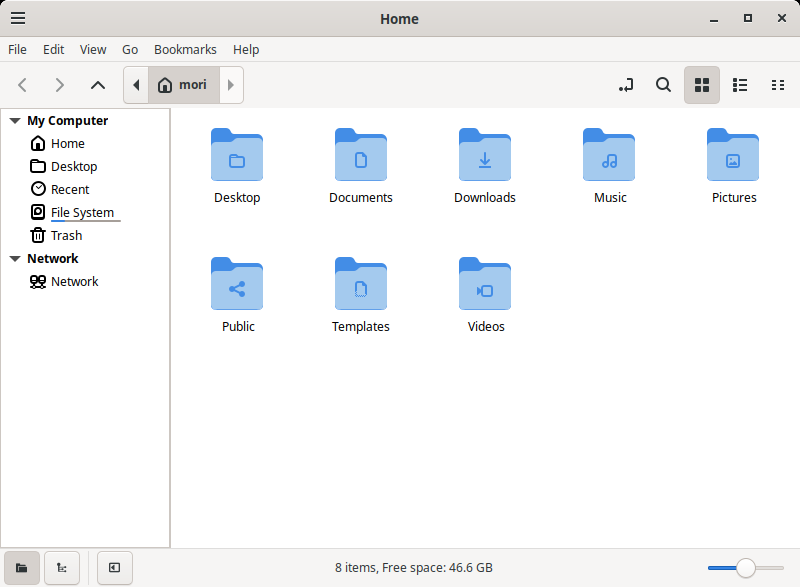
- Screenshot of Nemo v6.0.2
- Developer: Linux Mint
- Release: September 2012; 14 years ago
- Stable release: 6.6.4 / 23 February 2026
- Written in: C
- Operating system: Unix-like
- Platform: Cinnamon
- Available in: Multilingual
- Type: File manager
- License: GPL-2.0-or-later
- Website: github.com/linuxmint/nemo
- Repository: github.com/linuxmint/nemo

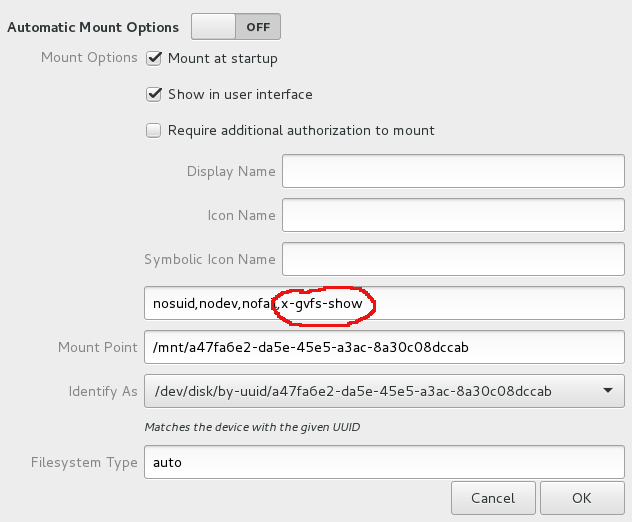
Whether Nemo shows a mount or not, is determined by the option x-gvfs-show for the gvfs-udisks2-volume-monitor process. Screenshot of GNOME Disks.

Nemo is a free and open-source software and official file manager of the Cinnamon desktop environment. It is a fork of GNOME Files (formerly named Nautilus).

== History ==
Nemo was created in 2012 by Clement Lefebvre and the developers of Linux Mint and Cinnamon as a fork of Nautilus 3.4. The fork was made in response to changes planned for Nautilus 3.6, which removed or changed several features that the Linux Mint developers considered important for their desktop environment. Among the changes were the removal of compact, dual-pane and sidebar views and changes to desktop-icon handling. Linux Mint lead developer Clement Lefebvre described Nautilus 3.6 as "a catastrophe" and said that the project was intended to preserve functionality that had been removed from the newer Nautilus release.

The project was developed specifically for integration with Cinnamon. Nemo was intended not only to provide file browsing, but also to integrate with the desktop environment's handling of files and the visible desktop. This led to Nemo retaining features from Nautilus 3.4 that had been removed or altered during Nautilus 3.6 development.

Nemo version 1.0.0 was released in July 2012 alongside Cinnamon 1.6. Its initial release included support for features such as SSH connections, FTP and MTP, as well as desktop icons, compact view, integrated terminal access, file-operation progress information and configurable path navigation. The project reached version 1.1.2 in November 2012.

With Cinnamon 1.6, Nemo became the default file manager for the Cinnamon desktop environment, replacing Nautilus in the default Cinnamon configuration. Nemo also took responsibility for drawing the desktop and providing desktop interaction in this early version of Cinnamon.

The name "Nemo" was chosen by developer Gwendal Le Bihan after Captain Nemo, the fictional captain of the Nautilus in the novels of Jules Verne.

Nemo subsequently developed independently of Nautilus while remaining closely integrated with Cinnamon. The project continued to add functionality and receive performance improvements as Cinnamon and Linux Mint evolved. In later versions, Nemo became a central component of Cinnamon's file-management and desktop experience. Its source repository continues to describe it as the official file manager of Cinnamon and as a fork of GNOME Files.

== Features ==
Nemo v1.0.0 had the following features as described by the developers:

- Uses GVfs and GIO
- All the features Nautilus 3.4 had and which are missing in Nautilus 3.6 (all desktop icons, compact view, etc.)
- Open in terminal (integral part of Nemo)
- Open as root (integral part of Nemo)
- File operations progress information (when copying or moving files, one can see the percentage and information about the operation on the window title and so also in the window list)
- Proper GTK bookmarks management
- Full navigation options (back, forward, up, refresh)
- Ability to toggle between the path entry and the path breadcrumb widgets
- Many more configuration options
- Ability to SSH into remote servers
- Native support for FTP (File Transfer Protocol) and MTP (Media Transfer Protocol)

== See also ==
- Comparison of file managers
