= Dconf =

Low-level configuration system for GNOME

dconf
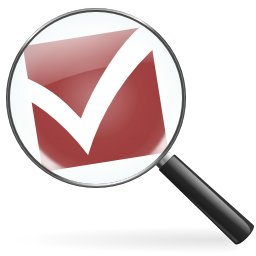

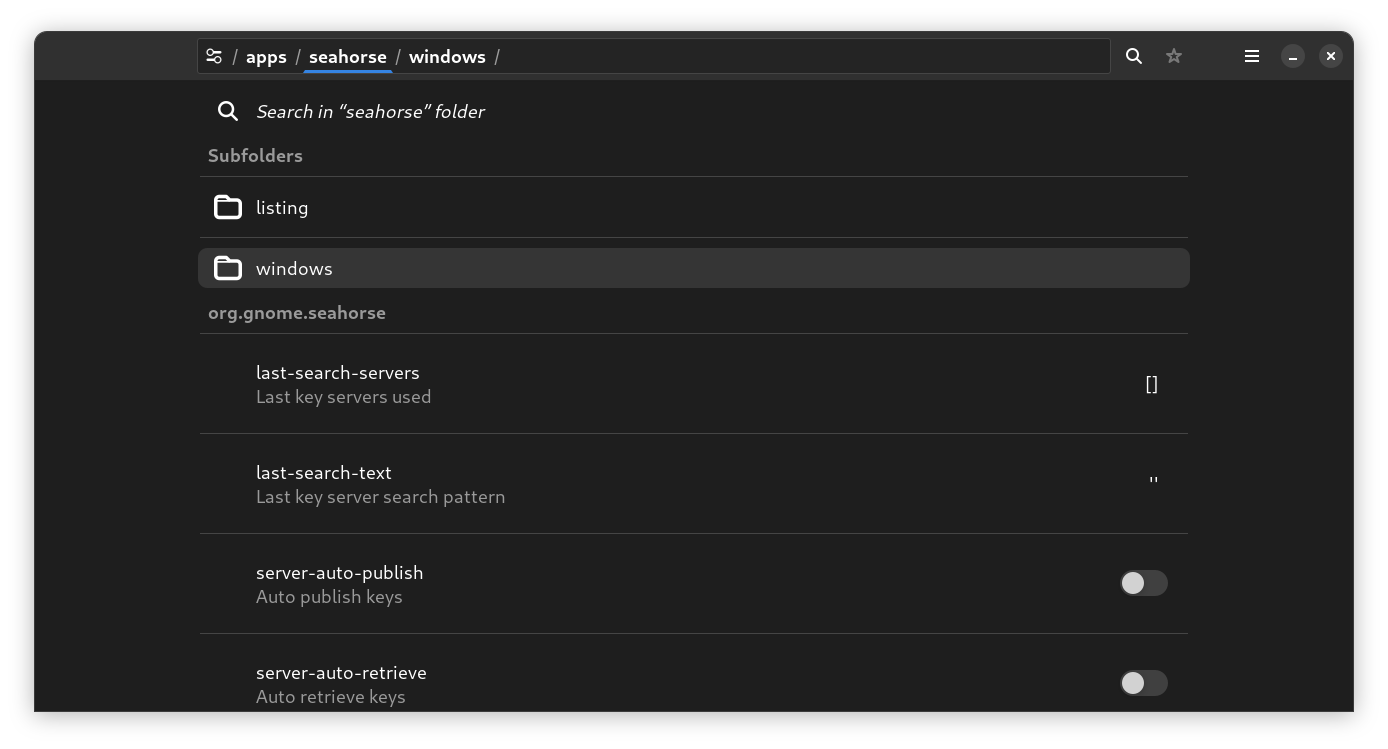
- A screenshot of dconf Editor
- Developer: The GNOME Project (Allison Lortie)
- Release: September 16, 2009; 17 years ago
- Stable release: 51.0 / 14 September 2026; 15 days ago
- Written in: C
- Type: Configuration, settings management
- License: GNU Lesser General Public License
- Website: wiki.gnome.org/Projects/dconf
- Repository: gitlab.gnome.org/GNOME/dconf

dconf is a low-level configuration system and settings management tool. Its main purpose is to provide a back end to GSettings on platforms that don't already have configuration storage systems. It depends on GLib. It is part of GNOME as of version 3, and is a replacement for GConf.

== Overview ==
dconf is a simple key-based configuration system. Keys exist in an unstructured database (but it is intended that keys that logically belong together are grouped together).

Change notification is supported.

Stacking of multiple configuration sources is supported. Mandatory keys are supported.

The stacking can be done at "mount points". For example, the global system configuration can be mounted under /system/ inside of each user's configuration space. A single configuration source may appear at multiple points in the hierarchy. For example, in addition to stacking over the normal keys at /user/, the system default keys may also appear at /default/ for inspection and modification by a system policy configuration utility.

PolicyKit integration is planned so that a normal user may temporarily gain the ability to, for example, write to the keys under /system/ (or /default/). This means that programs like the GNOME Display Manager configuration utility will no longer have to be run as root.

dconf is loosely the GNOME equivalent of the Windows Registry.

== Software architecture ==
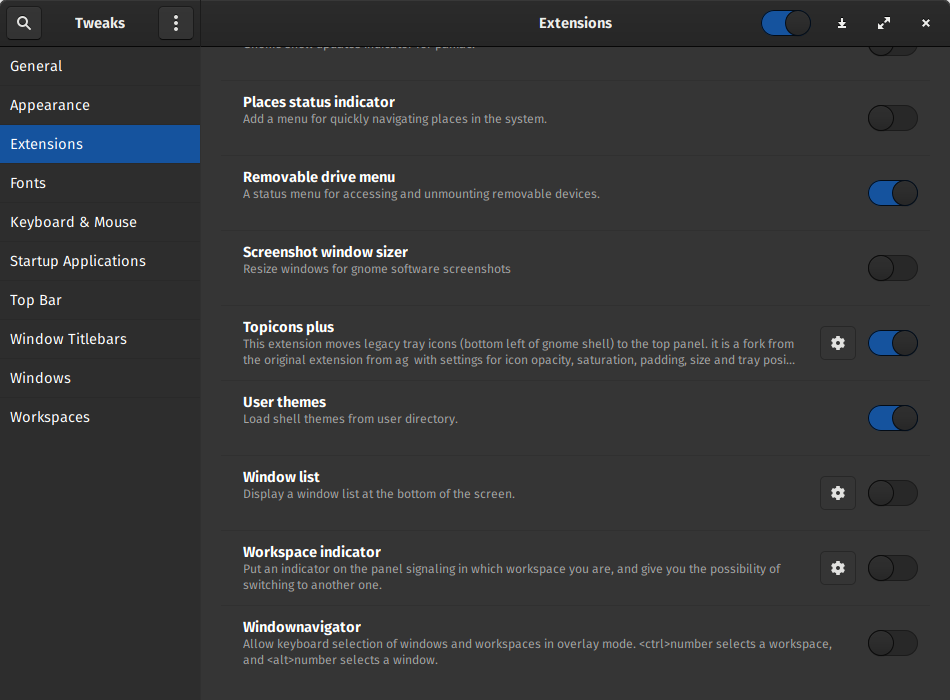
GNOME Tweak Tool gives access to a certain popular subset of the desktop settings.

Since a typical GNOME login consists of thousands of reads and ideally 0 writes, dconf is optimized for reads. Typically, reading a key from dconf involves zero system calls and zero context switches. This is achieved with a simple file format that doubles both as the storage format for data in dconf and as an IPC mechanism between the clients and the server.

Avoiding round trips and context switches is desirable in itself, but the real advantage comes from allowing the I/O scheduler in the kernel to do a better job by saturating it with requests coming from all of the applications trying to read their keys (as opposed to a common configuration server serially requesting a single key at a time).

Having all of the keys in a single compact binary format also avoids the intense fragmentation problems currently experienced by the tree-of-directories-of-xml-files approach.

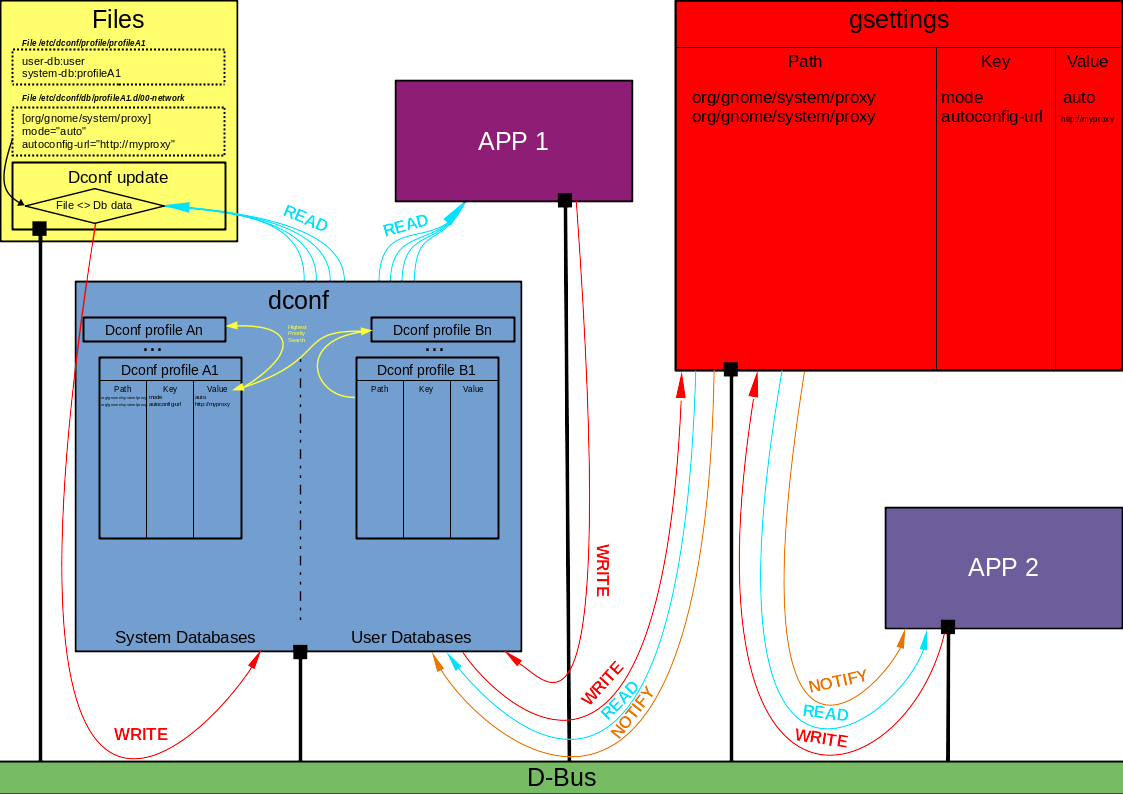
dconf Architecture

Writes are less optimized – they traverse the bus and are handled by a "writer" – a D-Bus service – in the ordinary way. Change notification is also handled by the writer. The reason for having a bus service at all is that getting the clients to synchronize on writing would be very difficult.

The writer service doesn't have to be activated until the first write operation is performed.

The service is completely stateless and can start and stop dynamically. The list of change notifications that an individual client is interested in is maintained by the bus daemon (as a D-Bus signal watch/match list).

=== dconf database ===
One dconf database consists of a single file in binary format, i.e. it is not a text-file. The format is defined as gvdb (GVariant Database file). It is a simple database file format that stores a mapping from strings to GVariant values in a way that is extremely efficient for lookups.

The GNOME database file for each user is by default ~/.config/dconf/user, a file expected to be in GVDB format.

=== GVariant ===
GVariant is a strongly typed variant datatype used for all the values stored in dconf; it can contain one or more values along with information about the type of the values.

A GVariant may contain simple types, like integers, or Boolean values; or complex types, like an array of two strings, or a dictionary of key value pairs. A GVariant is also immutable: once it's been created, neither its type nor its content can be modified further. GVariant is useful whenever data needs to be serialized, for example when sending method parameters in DBus, or when saving settings using GSettings.

GVariant is part of GLib.

- https://developer.gnome.org/glib/stable/glib-GVariant.html
- https://git.gnome.org/browse/glib/tree/glib/gvariant.c

=== GSettings ===
The GSettings class provides a high-level API for application for storing and retrieving their own settings.

In Debian, the utility program /usr/bin/gsettings is contained in the package libglib2.0-bin.

GSettings is part of GIO. which is part of GLib. libglib2.0-0

- https://developer.gnome.org/gio/stable/GSettings.html
- https://git.gnome.org/browse/glib/tree/gio/gsettings.c

== Documentation ==
A system administrators guide for dconf is available. Since version 0.2, dconf is licensed under the LGPL version 2.1 "or later".

== History ==
=== Release history ===
Version	Release date	Significant changes
0.1	2009-09-18	
0.2	2009-10-27	
0.3	2010-05-25	
0.4	2010-07-12	
0.5	2010-09-15	
0.6	2010-12-21	
0.7	2011-05-09	
0.8	2011-07-26	
0.9	2011-09-19	
0.10	2011-09-26	
0.11	2012-03-19	
0.12	2012-05-01	
0.13	2012-08-20	
0.14	2012-11-01	
0.15	2013-02-11	
0.16	2013-07-16	
0.17	2013-09-16	
0.18	2013-09-23	
0.19	2014-03-17	
0.20	2014-03-24	dconf compile: always write little endian
0.21	2014-07-22	
0.22	2014-09-19	
0.23	2015-03-16	split dconf-editor into a separate package
0.24	2015-03-23	
0.25	2015-12-16	
0.26	2016-03-23	libdbus-1 back-end removed; dconf now always uses GDBus
0.27	2017-10-17	Port to Meson build system (#784910)
0.49	2025-09-15	
51	2026-09-14	
