= Linux Mint =

Ubuntu or Debian-based Linux distribution

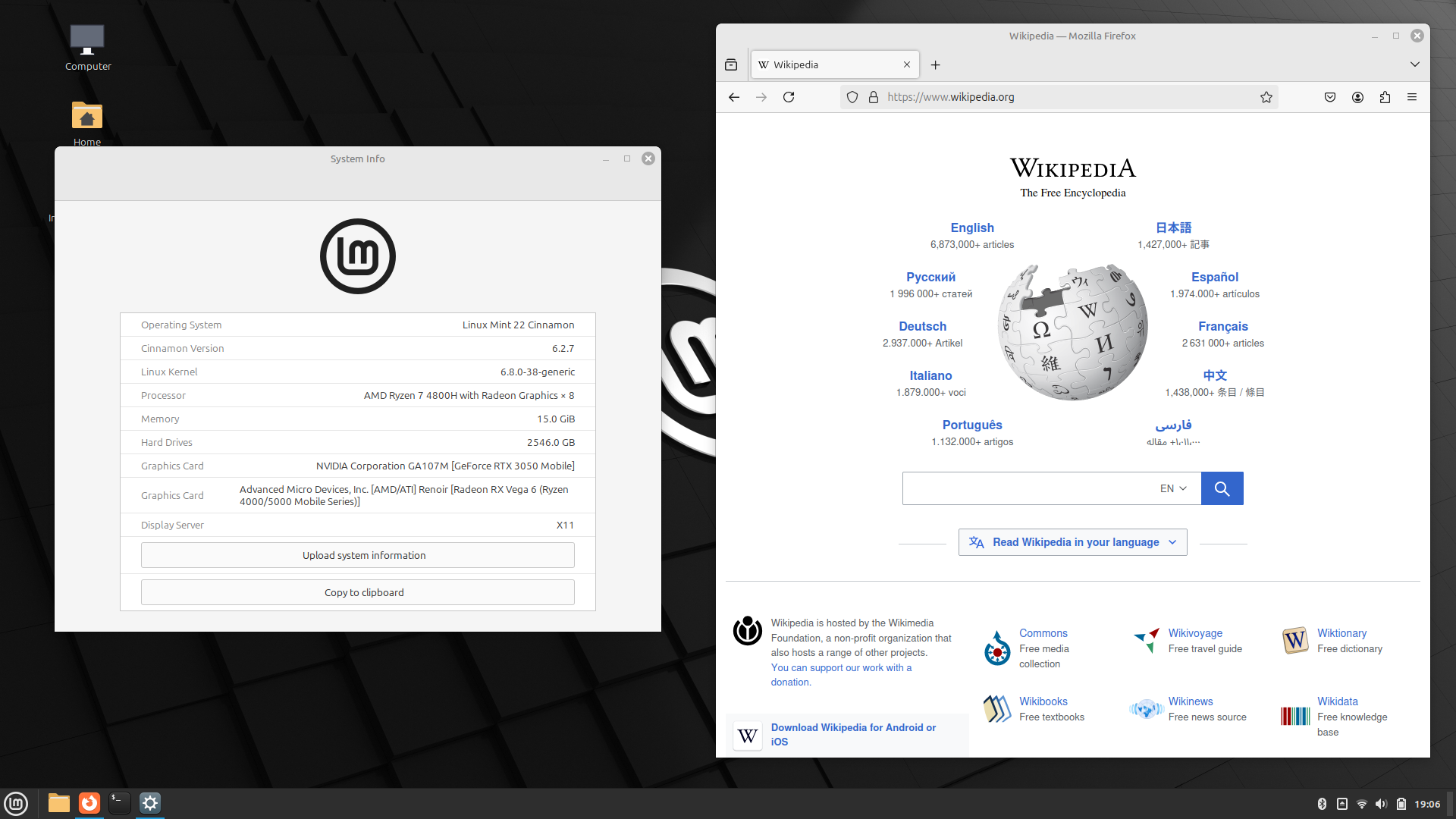
- Linux Mint 22 "Wilma" using Cinnamon 6.2.7
- Developer: Clément Lefèbvre, Linux Mint Teams and community
- OS family: Unix-like
- Working state: Current
- Source model: Open source
- Initial release: 27 August 2006; 20 years ago
- Latest release: Main: 22.3 13 January 2026; 9 months ago; LMDE: LMDE 7 14 October 2025; 12 months ago
- Repository: github.com/linuxmint
- Available in: Multilingual
- Update method: APT (command line); Software Manager, Update Manager & Synaptic (graphical user interfaces)
- Package manager: APT (dpkg) · Flatpak
- Supported platforms: x86-64
- Kernel type: Monolithic (Linux)
- Userland: GNU
- Default user interface: Cinnamon; Optional: MATE or Xfce (Note: The desktop environments Linux Mint offers has changed throughout releases of Linux Mint: 1.0: KDE; 2.0-12: GNOME; 13-17.3: Cinnamon / MATE / KDE 4 / Xfce; 18-18.3: Cinnamon / MATE / KDE Plasma 5 / Xfce; 19 – present : Cinnamon / MATE / Xfce)
- License: Mainly GPL and other free software licenses, minor additions of proprietary software
- Official website: www.linuxmint.com

Linux Mint is a community-developed Linux distribution for x86-64 systems, based on Ubuntu. First released in 2006, Linux Mint is often noted for its ease of use, out-of-the-box functionality, and appeal to desktop users. It comes bundled with a selection of free and open-source software. The default desktop environment is Cinnamon, developed by the Linux Mint team, with MATE and Xfce available as alternatives. A Debian based version of Linux Mint also exists, called Linux Mint Debian Edition (LMDE).

== History ==
=== 2006–2013 ===
Linux Mint began in 2006 with a beta release, 1.0, code named 'Ada', based on Kubuntu and using its KDE interface. Linux Mint 2.0 'Barbara' was the first version to use Ubuntu as its codebase and its GNOME interface. It had few users until the release of Linux Mint 3.0, 'Cassandra'. Linux Mint 2.0 was based on Ubuntu 6.10 using Ubuntu's package repositories and using it as a codebase. It then followed its own codebase, building each release from the previous one, but continuing to use the package repositories of the latest Ubuntu release. This made the two systems' bases almost identical, guaranteeing full compatibility between them, rather than requiring Mint to be a fork.

Initially, there were two yearly Linux Mint releases, timed to be approximately one month after Ubuntu releases (which in turn are about one month after GNOME releases and two months after X Window System releases). In 2008, Linux Mint adopted the same release cycle as Ubuntu and dropped its minor version number before releasing version 5 'Elyssa', and every fourth release was labeled a LTS version, indicating that it was supported (with updates) for longer than traditional releases. The same year, in an effort to increase compatibility between the two systems, Linux Mint decided to abandon its codebase and starting with Linux Mint 6 'Felicia' each release was based completely on the latest Ubuntu release, built directly from it, and made available approximately one month after the corresponding Ubuntu release (usually in May or November).

In 2010, Linux Mint released Linux Mint Debian Edition (LMDE). Unlike the other Ubuntu-based editions (Ubuntu Mint), LMDE was originally a rolling release based directly on Debian and not tied to Ubuntu packages or its release schedule. It was announced on 27 May 2015, that the Linux Mint team would no longer support the original rolling release version of LMDE after 1 January 2016. LMDE 2 'Betsy' was a long-term support release based on Debian Jessie. When LMDE 2 was released, it was announced that all LMDE users would be automatically upgraded to new versions of MintTools software and new desktop environments before they were released into the main edition of Linux Mint.

=== Since 2014 ===
In 2014 the successor to 17 Qiana was announced to be 17.1 Rebecca; the development team said that from a technical point of view Linux Mint was no longer tied to the Ubuntu schedule, so it could be released at any time, although the six-month cycle provided rhythm, leading to a late November 2014 target.

On 20 February 2016, the Linux Mint website was breached by unknown hackers who briefly replaced download links for a version of Linux Mint with a modified version containing malware. The hackers also breached the database of the website's user forum. Linux Mint immediately took its server offline and implemented enhanced security configurations for their website and forum.

Beginning with the release of Linux Mint 18 (Sarah), the OEM version, (Note: the OEM version was for manufacturers to use to pre-install Linux Mint onto devices. This functionality is now available in the Live-ISO boot menu) and the No Codecs version (Note: Also called 'Light' version. This version was for magazines, companies, and distributors in the United States, Japan, and countries where the legislation allows patents to apply to software and distribution of restricted technologies may require the acquisition of third-party licences. Users now have the option of whether or not to install multimedia codecs, now downloaded from the internet, additionally, multimedia codecs can also be installed via a link on the Mint Welcome Screen any time after installation.) was discontinued in order to reduce the number of ISO images that needed to be maintained.

Starting with Linux Mint 20, only 64-bit architecture is supported. This is because Canonical decided to drop 32-bit support from Ubuntu 20.04, which is the base from which Linux Mint 20 is derived. Starting with LMDE 7 The Debian-based LMDE no longer supports 32-bit processors as Debian 13 Trixie that LMDE 7 is based upon no longer supports 32 bit.

== Features ==
Linux Mint primarily uses free and open-source software. Before version 18, some proprietary software, such as device drivers, Adobe Flash Player and codecs for MP3 and DVD-Video playback, were bundled with the OS. Starting with version 18, the installer provides an option to install third-party, proprietary software.

Linux Mint comes bundled with a wide range of application software, including LibreOffice, Firefox, Thunderbird, Transmission, and VLC media player. Additional programs can be downloaded using the package manager, adding a PPA, or adding a source to the sources file in the /etc/apt/ directory. Linux Mint allows networking ports to be closed using its firewall, with customized port selection available. The default Linux Mint desktop environments, Cinnamon, MATE and Xfce, support many languages. Linux Mint can also run many programs designed for Microsoft Windows (such as Microsoft Office), using the Wine compatibility layer.

Linux Mint is available with a number of desktop environments to choose from, including the default Cinnamon desktop, MATE and Xfce. Other desktop environments can be installed via APT, Synaptic, or via the custom Mint Software Manager.

Linux Mint implements Mandatory Access Control with AppArmor to enhance security by default, and restricts the default network-facing processes.

Linux Mint actively develops software for its operating system. Most of the development is done in Python and the source code is available on GitHub.

=== Software by Linux Mint ===
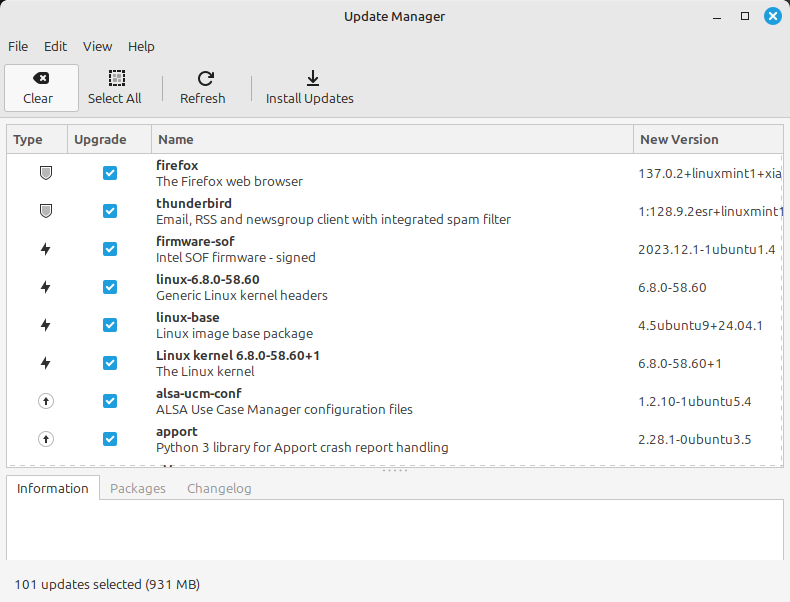
The interface for mintUpdate, Linux Mint's Update tool

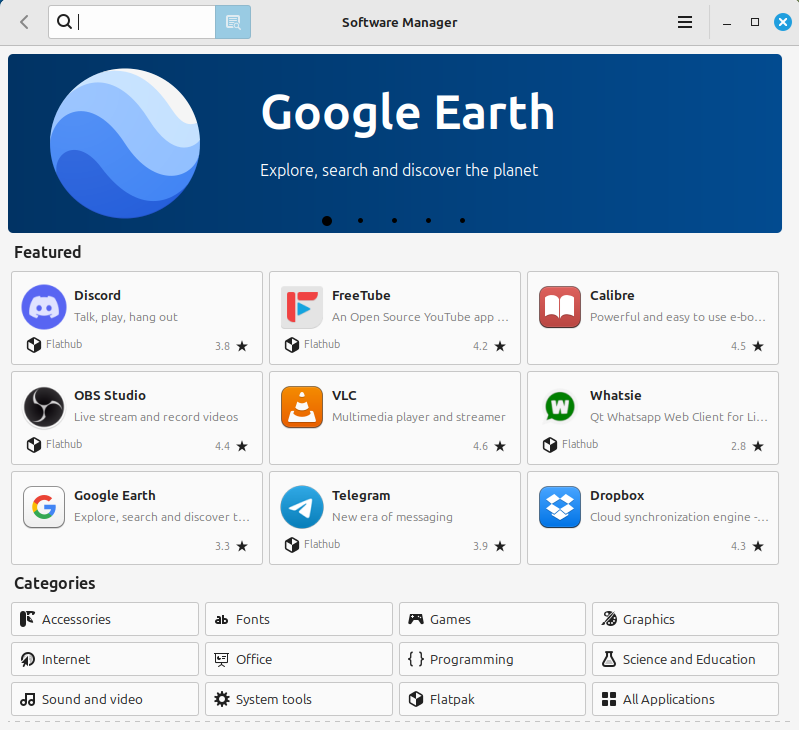
The Linux Mint Software Manager allows users to view, install, and uninstall programs.

==== Cinnamon ====
The Cinnamon desktop environment is a fork of GNOME Shell with Mint Gnome Shell Extensions (MGSE) on top. It was released as an add-on for Linux Mint 12 and has been available as a default desktop environment since Linux Mint 13.

==== Other desktop environments ====
- Xfce: Lighter desktop environment than Cinnamon, supporting fewer features.
- MATE: middle-ground between Cinnamon and Xfce, offering a classic GNOME 2 style layout, used by Mint's default desktop between 2006 and 2011.
- On Linux Mint release 18.3 (Sylvia), they removed KDE Plasma to cut down on the number of ISOs needed to maintain every version. However, the KDE 17.x and 18.x releases were supported until 2019 and 2021, respectively.

==== Hypnotix ====
Hypnotix is the IPTV software developed by the Mint team. The first prototype was released in 2020 following positive reaction to the announcement of the team that it could develop an IPTV application.

==== MintTools ====
- Software Manager (mintInstall): Designed to install software from the Ubuntu and Linux Mint software repositories, as well as Launchpad PPAs. Since Linux Mint 18.3, the Software Manager has also been able to install software from Flatpak remotes, and is configured with Flathub by default. It features an interface heavily inspired by GNOME Software, and is built upon GTK3.
- Update Manager (mintUpdate): Designed to prevent inexperienced users from installing updates that are unnecessary or require a certain level of knowledge to configure properly. Updates can be set to notify users (as is normal), be listed but not notify, or be hidden by default. In addition to including updates specifically for the Linux Mint distribution, the development team tests all package-wide updates. In newer versions of the operating system, this safety level mechanism is largely deactivated in favor of system snapshots created by the Timeshift tool.
- Main Menu (mintMenu): Created for the MATE desktop environment. It is a menu of options including filtering, installation, and removal of software, system and places links, favourites, session management, editable items, custom places and many configuration options.
- Backup Tool (mintBackup): Enables the user to back up and restore data. Data can be backed up before a fresh install of a newer release, and then restored.
- Upload Manager (mintUpload): Defines upload services for FTP, SFTP and SCP servers. Services are then available in the system tray and provide zones where they may be automatically uploaded to their corresponding destinations. As of Linux Mint 18.3, this software is no longer installed by default but is still available in the Linux Mint software repositories.
- Domain Blocker (mintNanny): A basic domain blocking parental control tool introduced with v6. Enables the user to manually add domains to be blocked system-wide. As of Linux Mint 18.3, this software is no longer installed by default but is still available in the Linux Mint software repositories.
- Desktop Settings (mintDesktop): A tool for configuration of the desktop.
- Welcome Screen (mintWelcome): Introduced in Linux Mint 7, an application that starts on the first login of any new account. It provides links to the Linux Mint website, user guide, and community website. It also gives a user some first steps such as choosing a desktop color, installing updates and drivers, and making system snapshots.
- USB Image Writer/USB Stick Formatter (mintStick): A tool for writing an image onto a USB drive or formatting a USB stick.
- System Reports (mintReport): Introduced in Linux Mint 18.3, the purpose of System Reports is to allow the user to view and manage automatically generated application crash reports. This application can also suggest users to take actions on their system such as installing drivers or taking system snapshots.

== Editions ==
Linux Mint has multiple editions based on Ubuntu, with various desktop environments available. It also has a Debian-based edition.

=== Ubuntu-based editions ===
As of Linux Mint 22.3, there are three main editions developed by the core development team and using Ubuntu as a base. One includes Linux Mint's own Cinnamon as the desktop environment, the second uses MATE and the third uses Xfce. Since the release of version 19 (Tara) in June 2018, the three editions are released simultaneously.

=== Cinnamon (Edge) Edition ===
In addition to its regular ISO images, Linux Mint sometimes provides an "edge" ISO image for its latest release. This image ships with newer components such as the kernel to be able to support the most modern hardware chipsets and devices. As of Linux Mint 22 series, there are no edge editions and instead use the latest HWE kernel series if available.

=== LMDE ===
Demonstration of Cinnamon running on LMDE 6

The Linux Mint Debian Edition (LMDE) uses Debian Stable as the software source base rather than Ubuntu. LMDE was originally based directly on Debian's Testing branch, but it was designed to provide the same functionality and look and feel as the Ubuntu-based editions. LMDE has its own package repositories.

The original LMDE (now often referred to as LMDE 1) had a semi-rolling release development model, which periodically introduced 'Update Packs' (tested snapshots of Debian Testing). Installing an Update Pack allowed the user to keep LMDE 1 current without having to reinstall the system every six months, as with standard Mint. LMDE 2 (named Betsy) was released in 2015 and was based on Debian Jessie, transitioning into a fixed point release model. It received automatic updates to the latest versions of MintTools and the installed desktop environment before they were released into the main Mint edition. LMDE 2 was available with both the MATE and Cinnamon desktop environments. Unlike the Debian version it was based on, LMDE 2 remained based on sysvinit but with a 'functional logind' from systemd.

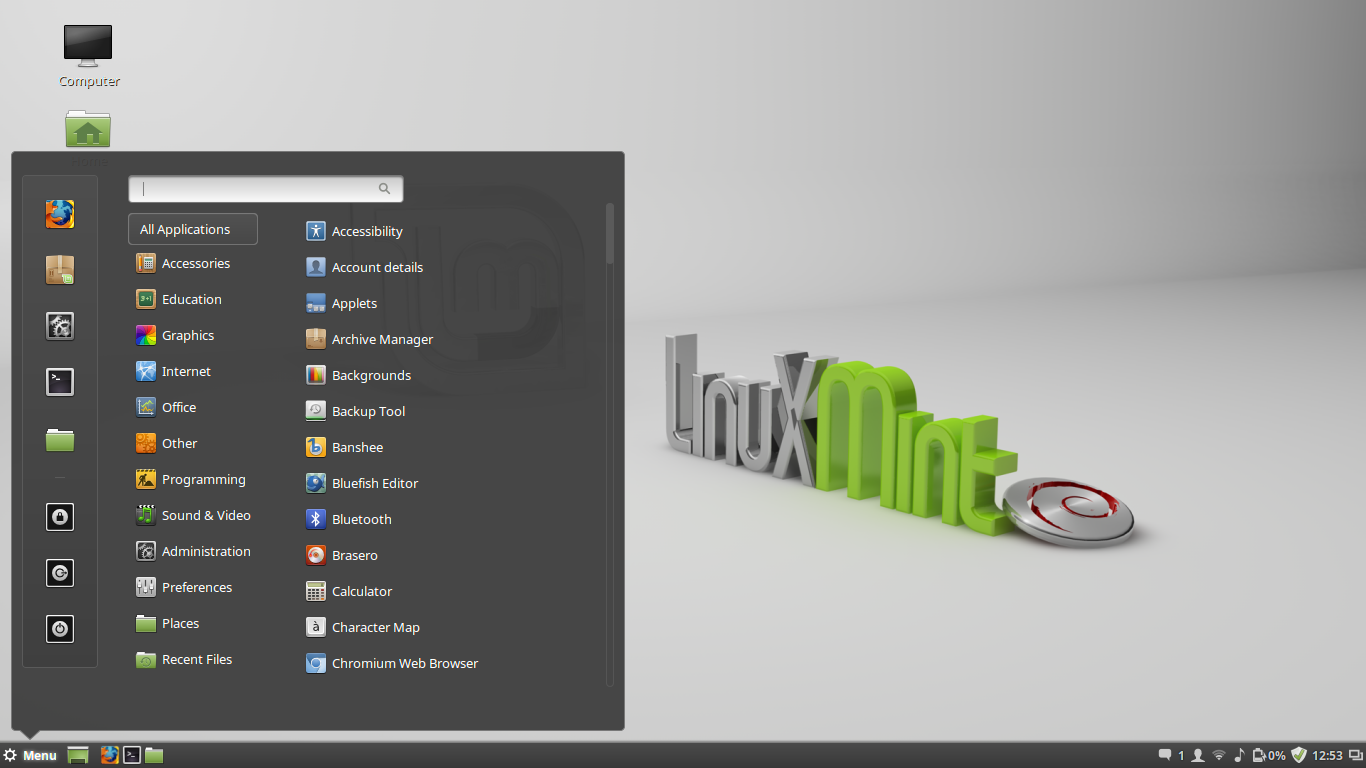
LMDE 2 'Betsy' running Cinnamon 2.8

LMDE 3 (named Cindy) completed the switch from sysvinit to systemd. It was based on Debian Stretch and was released in 2018, shipping as a single edition with Cinnamon. The latest version of LMDE, version 7 (Gigi), based on Debian Trixie, was released on October 14, 2025. It dropped support for i386, exclusively supporting amd64.

== Development ==
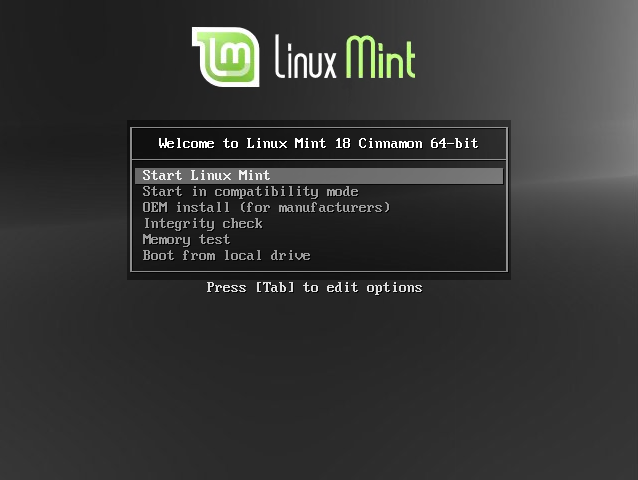
Linux Mint 18 Cinnamon Edition's live CD boot menu

Individual users and companies using the operating system act as donors, sponsors, and partners of the distribution. Linux Mint relies on user feedback to make decisions and orient its development. The official blog often features discussions where users are asked to voice their opinion about the latest features or decisions implemented for upcoming releases. Ideas can be submitted, commented upon and rated by users via the Linux Mint Community Website.

The community of Linux Mint users use Launchpad to participate in the translation of the operating system and in reporting bugs.

Most development is done in Python, C and Javascript and organized online using GitHub.

=== Releases ===
Linux Mint does not set fixed release dates, instead publishing new versions "when ready". This approach allows for early releases if ahead of schedule or delays if critical bugs are found.

Every version of Linux Mint is given a version number along with a code name. Up to and including version 22.3, each code name was a feminine first name ending in 'a' and beginning with a letter of the alphabet that increased with every major revision. From version 27, all code names are masculine.

In 2014, with the release of Linux Mint 17, the team adopted a new release strategy, with all future versions planned to use a LTS version of Ubuntu as a base, until 2016.

== X-Apps ==
In 2016, the Linux Mint team released the X-Apps, a collection of applications that aims to work across different GTK-based desktop environments such as but not limited to Cinnamon, Budgie, Unity, MATE, and Xfce; most of these applications have a traditional user interface (UI), for example, using a menu bar instead of a header-bar. According to the team, the integration of many applications as tied to specific environments and that was the case of a growing number of GNOME applications.

In 2024 the Linux Mint team proposed moving X-Apps out of the Linux Mint development process and turning it into a fully independent project. By September 2026 its libraries, tools and applications were used in many desktops and distributions, and the XApp project was given its own website. Most of them are forks of GNOME Core Applications.

== Reception ==
In a 2012 online poll at Lifehacker, Linux Mint was voted the second best Linux distribution, after Ubuntu, with almost 16% of the votes. In October 2012 (Issue 162), Linux Format named Linux Mint the best distro for 2012. In May 2013, David Hayward of TechRadar praised Linux Mint for focusing on desktop users. In July 2013 (Issue 128), Linux User & Developer gave Linux Mint 15 "Olivia" a score of 5/5, stating "We haven't found a single problem with the distro... we're more than satisfied with the smooth, user-friendly experience that Linux Mint 15, and Cinnamon 1.8, provides for it to be our main distro for at least another 6 months".

In 2016, reviews of Linux Mint 18 "Sarah" were somewhat mixed, with several that were quite favorable and others critical of several specific new problems, with multiple reviews complaining about the lack of multimedia/codec support by default. Multimedia codecs that had previously been included in the standard Mint distribution were no longer included in "Sarah", but could be loaded with a graphical application that one Ars Technica reviewer said should be obvious for new users.

ZDNet Contributing Editor Steven J. Vaughan-Nichols, reviewing Linux Mint 19 and LM 19.1 in the articles "The Linux Mint desktop continues to lead the rest" in July 2018 and "The better-than-ever Linux desktop" in December 2018, noted Mint's quality, stability, security and user-friendliness compared to other popular distributions. ZDNet's review of Linux Mint 19.2 said: "After looking at many Linux desktops year in and out, Linux Mint is the best of the breed. It's easy to learn (even if you've never used Linux before), powerful, and with its traditional windows, icons, menus, and pointers (WIMP) interface, it's simple to use."

In 2024, Linux Mint 22 was released which received mostly positive reviews. Steven J. Vaughan-Nichols, senior contributing editor at ZD Net praised Mint's propensity to remain the same in terms of functionality. The Register points to the fact that unverified Flatpak packages are now off by default and users need to explicitly enable the option to make them visible. This move has reduced the number of packages in Flathub.

== Release history ==
Linux Mint version history
Version	Codename	Edition	Codebase	Compatible repository	Desktop environment	Release date	LTS	Support end
1.0	Ada	Main	Kubuntu 6.06 (Dapper Drake)		KDE	27 August 2006	—N/a	Unknown
2.0	Barbara	Main	Ubuntu 6.10 (Edgy Eft)		GNOME	13 November 2006	—N/a	April 2008
2.1	Bea	Main	Ubuntu 6.10 (Edgy Eft)		GNOME	20 December 2006	—N/a	April 2008
2.2	Bianca	Main	Ubuntu 6.10 (Edgy Eft)		GNOME	20 February 2007	—N/a	April 2008
2.2	Bianca	Light	Ubuntu 6.10 (Edgy Eft)		GNOME	29 March 2007	—N/a	April 2008
2.2	Bianca	KDE CE	Kubuntu 6.10		KDE	20 April 2007	—N/a	April 2008
3.0	Cassandra	Main	Bianca 2.2	Ubuntu 7.04 (Feisty Fawn)	GNOME	30 May 2007	—N/a	October 2008
3.0	Cassandra	Light	Bianca 2.2	Ubuntu 7.04 (Feisty Fawn)	GNOME	15 June 2007	—N/a	October 2008
3.0	Cassandra	KDE CE	Bianca 2.2	Kubuntu 7.04	KDE	14 August 2007	—N/a	October 2008
3.0	Cassandra	MiniKDE CE	Bianca 2.2	Kubuntu 7.04	KDE	14 August 2007	—N/a	October 2008
3.0	Cassandra	Xfce CE	Cassandra 3.0	Xubuntu 7.04	Xfce	7 August 2007	—N/a	October 2008
3.1	Celena	Main	Bianca 2.2	Ubuntu 7.04 (Feisty Fawn)	GNOME	24 September 2007	—N/a	October 2008
3.1	Celena	Light	Bianca 2.2	Ubuntu 7.04 (Feisty Fawn)	GNOME	1 October 2007	—N/a	October 2008
4.0	Daryna	Main	Celena 3.1	Ubuntu 7.10 (Gutsy Gibbon)	GNOME	15 November 2007	—N/a	April 2009
4.0	Daryna	Light	Celena 3.1	Ubuntu 7.10 (Gutsy Gibbon)	GNOME	15 November 2007	—N/a	April 2009
4.0	Daryna	KDE CE	Cassandra 3.0	Kubuntu 7.10	KDE	3 March 2008	—N/a	April 2009
5	Elyssa	Main	Daryna 4.0	Ubuntu 8.04 (Hardy Heron)	GNOME	8 June 2008	Yes	April 2011
5	Elyssa	Light	Daryna 4.0	Ubuntu 8.04 (Hardy Heron)	GNOME	8 June 2008	Yes	April 2011
5	Elyssa	x64	Ubuntu 8.04 (Hardy Heron)	Ubuntu 8.04 (Hardy Heron)	GNOME	18 October 2008	Yes	April 2011
5	Elyssa	KDE CE	Daryna 4.0	Kubuntu 8.04	KDE	15 September 2008	Yes	April 2011
5	Elyssa	Xfce CE	Daryna 4.0	Xubuntu 8.04	Xfce	8 September 2008	Yes	April 2011
5	Elyssa	Fluxbox CE	Ubuntu 8.04 (Hardy Heron)		Fluxbox	21 October 2008	Yes	April 2011
6	Felicia	Main	Ubuntu 8.10 (Intrepid Ibex)		GNOME	15 December 2008	No	April 2010
6	Felicia	Universal (Light)	Ubuntu 8.10 (Intrepid Ibex)		GNOME	15 December 2008	No	April 2010
6	Felicia	x64	Ubuntu 8.10 (Intrepid Ibex)		GNOME	6 February 2009	No	April 2010
6	Felicia	KDE CE	Elyssa 5	Kubuntu 8.10	KDE	8 April 2009	No	April 2010
6	Felicia	Xfce CE	Xubuntu 8.10	Xubuntu 8.10	Xfce	24 February 2009	No	April 2010
6	Felicia	Fluxbox CE	Xubuntu 8.10	Ubuntu 8.10	Fluxbox	7 April 2009	No	April 2010
7	Gloria	Main	Ubuntu 9.04 (Jaunty Jackalope)		GNOME	26 May 2009	No	October 2010
7	Gloria	Universal (Light)	Ubuntu 9.04 (Jaunty Jackalope)		GNOME	26 May 2009	No	October 2010
7	Gloria	x64	Ubuntu 9.04 (Jaunty Jackalope)		GNOME	24 June 2009	No	October 2010
7	Gloria	KDE CE	Kubuntu 9.04		KDE	3 August 2009	No	October 2010
7	Gloria	Xfce CE	Xubuntu 9.04		Xfce	13 September 2009	No	October 2010
8	Helena	Main	Ubuntu 9.10 (Karmic Koala)		GNOME	28 November 2009	No	April 2011
8	Helena	Universal (Light)	Ubuntu 9.10 (Karmic Koala)		GNOME	28 November 2009	No	April 2011
8	Helena	Gnome x64	Ubuntu 9.10 (Karmic Koala)		GNOME	14 December 2009	No	April 2011
8	Helena	KDE	Kubuntu 9.10		KDE	6 February 2010	No	April 2011
8	Helena	KDE x64	Kubuntu 9.10		KDE	12 February 2010	No	April 2011
8	Helena	Fluxbox	Helena Main	Ubuntu 9.10 (Karmic Koala)	Fluxbox	12 February 2010	No	April 2011
8	Helena	Xfce	Xubuntu 9.10		Xfce	31 March 2010	No	April 2011
8	Helena	LXDE	Helena Main	Ubuntu 9.10 (Karmic Koala)	LXDE	31 March 2010	No	April 2011
9	Isadora	Main	Ubuntu 10.04 LTS (Lucid Lynx)		GNOME	18 May 2010	Yes	April 2013
9	Isadora	Gnome x64	Ubuntu 10.04 LTS (Lucid Lynx)		GNOME	18 May 2010	Yes	April 2013
9	Isadora	LXDE	Lubuntu 10.04 LTS		LXDE	18 July 2010	Yes	April 2013
9	Isadora	KDE	Kubuntu 10.04 LTS		KDE	27 July 2010	Yes	April 2013
9	Isadora	KDE x64	Kubuntu 10.04 LTS		KDE	27 July 2010	Yes	April 2013
9	Isadora	Xfce	Xubuntu 10.04 LTS		Xfce	24 August 2010	Yes	April 2013
9	Isadora	Fluxbox	Lubuntu 10.04 LTS		Fluxbox	6 September 2010	Yes	April 2013
10	Julia	Main	Ubuntu 10.10 (Maverick Meerkat)		GNOME	12 November 2010	No	April 2012
10	Julia	Gnome x64	Ubuntu 10.10 (Maverick Meerkat)		GNOME	12 November 2010	No	April 2012
10	Julia	KDE	Kubuntu 10.10		KDE	23 February 2011	No	April 2012
10	Julia	KDE x64	Kubuntu 10.10		KDE	23 February 2011	No	April 2012
10	Julia	LXDE	Lubuntu 10.10		LXDE	16 March 2011	No	April 2012
11	Katya	Main	Ubuntu 11.04 (Natty Narwhal)		GNOME	26 May 2011	No	October 2012
11	Katya	Gnome x64	Ubuntu 11.04 (Natty Narwhal)		GNOME	26 May 2011	No	October 2012
11	Katya	LXDE	Lubuntu 11.04		LXDE	16 August 2011	No	October 2012
12	Lisa	Main	Ubuntu 11.10 (Oneiric Ocelot)		GNOME 3 with MGSE (Note: MGSE: Mint GNOME 3 Shell Extensions (providing a desktop environment similar to GNOME 2))	26 November 2011	No	April 2013
12	Lisa	KDE	Kubuntu 11.10		KDE	2 February 2012	No	April 2013
12	Lisa	LXDE	Lubuntu 11.10		LXDE	9 March 2012	No	April 2013
13	Maya	Cinnamon; MATE; Xfce; KDE	Ubuntu 12.04 LTS (Precise Pangolin)		Cinnamon; MATE	23 May 2012	Yes	April 2017
13	Maya	Cinnamon; MATE; Xfce; KDE	Xubuntu 12.04 LTS		Xfce	21 July 2012	Yes	April 2017
13	Maya	Cinnamon; MATE; Xfce; KDE	Kubuntu 12.04 LTS		KDE	23 July 2012	Yes	April 2017
14	Nadia	Cinnamon; MATE; Xfce; KDE	Ubuntu 12.10 (Quantal Quetzal)		Cinnamon; MATE	20 November 2012	No	May 2014
14	Nadia	Cinnamon; MATE; Xfce; KDE	Xubuntu 12.10		Xfce	21 December 2012	No	May 2014
14	Nadia	Cinnamon; MATE; Xfce; KDE	Kubuntu 12.10		KDE	23 December 2012	No	May 2014
15	Olivia	Cinnamon; MATE; Xfce; KDE	Ubuntu 13.04 (Raring Ringtail)		Cinnamon; MATE	29 May 2013	No	January 2014
15	Olivia	Cinnamon; MATE; Xfce; KDE	Ubuntu 13.04 (Raring Ringtail)		Xfce	12 July 2013	No	January 2014
15	Olivia	Cinnamon; MATE; Xfce; KDE	Ubuntu 13.04 (Raring Ringtail)		KDE	21 July 2013	No	January 2014
16	Petra	Cinnamon; MATE; Xfce; KDE	Ubuntu 13.10 (Saucy Salamander)		Cinnamon; MATE	30 November 2013	No	July 2014
16	Petra	Cinnamon; MATE; Xfce; KDE	Ubuntu 13.10 (Saucy Salamander)		Xfce; KDE	22 December 2013	No	July 2014
17	Qiana	Cinnamon; MATE; Xfce; KDE	Ubuntu 14.04 LTS (Trusty Tahr)		Cinnamon; MATE	31 May 2014	Yes	April 2019
17	Qiana	Cinnamon; MATE; Xfce; KDE	Ubuntu 14.04 LTS (Trusty Tahr)		KDE	23 June 2014	Yes	April 2019
17	Qiana	Cinnamon; MATE; Xfce; KDE	Ubuntu 14.04 LTS (Trusty Tahr)		Xfce	26 June 2014	Yes	April 2019
17.1	Rebecca	Cinnamon; MATE; Xfce; KDE	Ubuntu 14.04 LTS (Trusty Tahr)		Cinnamon; MATE	29 November 2014	Yes	April 2019
17.1	Rebecca	Cinnamon; MATE; Xfce; KDE	Ubuntu 14.04 LTS (Trusty Tahr)		KDE	8 January 2015	Yes	April 2019
17.1	Rebecca	Cinnamon; MATE; Xfce; KDE	Ubuntu 14.04 LTS (Trusty Tahr)		Xfce	11 January 2015	Yes	April 2019
17.2	Rafaela	Cinnamon; MATE; Xfce; KDE	Ubuntu 14.04 LTS (Trusty Tahr)		Cinnamon; MATE	30 June 2015	Yes	April 2019
17.2	Rafaela	Cinnamon; MATE; Xfce; KDE	Ubuntu 14.04 LTS (Trusty Tahr)		KDE; Xfce	7 August 2015	Yes	April 2019
17.3	Rosa	Cinnamon; MATE; Xfce; KDE	Ubuntu 14.04 LTS (Trusty Tahr)		Cinnamon; MATE	4 December 2015	Yes	April 2019
17.3	Rosa	Cinnamon; MATE; Xfce; KDE	Ubuntu 14.04 LTS (Trusty Tahr)		KDE; Xfce	9 January 2016	Yes	April 2019
18	Sarah	Cinnamon; MATE; Xfce; KDE	Ubuntu 16.04 LTS (Xenial Xerus)		Cinnamon; MATE	30 June 2016	Yes	April 2021
18	Sarah	Cinnamon; MATE; Xfce; KDE	Ubuntu 16.04 LTS (Xenial Xerus)		KDE	19 September 2016	Yes	April 2021
18	Sarah	Cinnamon; MATE; Xfce; KDE	Ubuntu 16.04 LTS (Xenial Xerus)		Xfce	2 August 2016	Yes	April 2021
18.1	Serena	Cinnamon; MATE; Xfce; KDE	Ubuntu 16.04 LTS (Xenial Xerus)		Cinnamon; MATE	4 January 2017	Yes	April 2021
18.1	Serena	Cinnamon; MATE; Xfce; KDE	Ubuntu 16.04 LTS (Xenial Xerus)		KDE; Xfce	27 January 2017	Yes	April 2021
18.2	Sonya	Cinnamon; MATE; Xfce; KDE	Ubuntu 16.04 LTS (Xenial Xerus)		Cinnamon; MATE; KDE; Xfce	2 July 2017	Yes	April 2021
18.3	Sylvia	Cinnamon; MATE; Xfce; KDE	Ubuntu 16.04 LTS (Xenial Xerus)		Cinnamon; MATE	27 November 2017	Yes	April 2021
18.3	Sylvia	Cinnamon; MATE; Xfce; KDE	Ubuntu 16.04 LTS (Xenial Xerus)		KDE; Xfce	15 December 2017	Yes	April 2021
19	Tara	Cinnamon; MATE; Xfce	Ubuntu 18.04 LTS (Bionic Beaver)		Cinnamon; MATE; Xfce	29 June 2018	Yes	April 2023
19.1	Tessa	Cinnamon; MATE; Xfce	Ubuntu 18.04 LTS (Bionic Beaver)		Cinnamon; MATE; Xfce	19 December 2018	Yes	April 2023
19.2	Tina	Cinnamon; MATE; Xfce	Ubuntu 18.04 LTS (Bionic Beaver)		Cinnamon; MATE; Xfce	2 August 2019	Yes	April 2023
19.3	Tricia	Cinnamon; MATE; Xfce	Ubuntu 18.04 LTS (Bionic Beaver)		Cinnamon; MATE; Xfce	15 December 2019	Yes	April 2023
20	Ulyana	Cinnamon; MATE; Xfce	Ubuntu 20.04 LTS (Focal Fossa); Supports only amd64 (64-bit)		Cinnamon; MATE; Xfce	27 June 2020	Yes	April 2025
20.1	Ulyssa	Cinnamon; MATE; Xfce	Ubuntu 20.04 LTS (Focal Fossa); Supports only amd64 (64-bit)		Cinnamon; MATE; Xfce	8 January 2021	Yes	April 2025
20.2	Uma	Cinnamon; MATE; Xfce	Ubuntu 20.04 LTS (Focal Fossa); Supports only amd64 (64-bit)		Cinnamon; MATE; Xfce	8 July 2021	Yes	April 2025
20.3	Una	Cinnamon; MATE; Xfce	Ubuntu 20.04 LTS (Focal Fossa); Supports only amd64 (64-bit)		Cinnamon; MATE; Xfce	7 January 2022	Yes	April 2025
21	Vanessa	Cinnamon; MATE; Xfce	Ubuntu 22.04 LTS (Jammy Jellyfish); Supports only amd64 (64-bit)		Cinnamon; MATE; Xfce	31 July 2022	Yes	April 2027
21.1	Vera	Cinnamon; MATE; Xfce	Ubuntu 22.04 LTS (Jammy Jellyfish); Supports only amd64 (64-bit)		Cinnamon; MATE; Xfce	20 December 2022	Yes	April 2027
21.2	Victoria	Cinnamon; MATE; Xfce	Ubuntu 22.04 LTS (Jammy Jellyfish); Supports only amd64 (64-bit)		Cinnamon; MATE; Xfce	16 July 2023	Yes	April 2027
21.3	Virginia	Cinnamon; MATE; Xfce	Ubuntu 22.04 LTS (Jammy Jellyfish); Supports only amd64 (64-bit)		Cinnamon; MATE; Xfce	12 January 2024	Yes	April 2027
22	Wilma	Cinnamon; MATE; Xfce	Ubuntu 24.04 LTS (Noble Numbat); Supports only amd64 (64-bit)		Cinnamon; MATE; Xfce	25 July 2024	Yes	April 2029
22.1	Xia	Cinnamon; MATE; Xfce	Ubuntu 24.04 LTS (Noble Numbat); Supports only amd64 (64-bit)		Cinnamon; MATE; Xfce	16 January 2025	Yes	April 2029
22.2	Zara	Cinnamon; MATE; Xfce	Ubuntu 24.04 LTS (Noble Numbat); Supports only amd64 (64-bit)		Cinnamon; MATE; Xfce	4 September 2025	Yes	April 2029
22.3	Zena	Cinnamon; MATE; Xfce	Ubuntu 24.04 LTS (Noble Numbat); Supports only amd64 (64-bit)		Cinnamon; MATE; Xfce	13 January 2026	Yes	April 2029
27	Adrien	Cinnamon; MATE; Xfce	Ubuntu 26.04 LTS (Resolute Raccoon)		Cinnamon; MATE; Xfce	December 2026 / January 2027	Yes	TBA
Legend: Unsupported Supported Latest version Future version

Linux Mint Debian Edition version history
Version	Codename	ISO edition (Note: ISO Edition: Versions before LMDE 4 included a datecode in the bootable ISO image's filename. LMDE 2 images were issued twice; the second issue included updates to LMDE 2 up to that point.)	Debian base	Desktop environment	Release date	Support end
1	—N/a	201403	Wheezy (Debian 7)	Cinnamon; MATE; Supports both amd64 and i386	2 March 2014	1 January 2017
2	Betsy	201503	Jessie (Debian 8)	Cinnamon; MATE; Supports both amd64 and i386	10 April 2015	1 January 2019
2	Betsy	201701	Jessie (Debian 8)	Cinnamon; MATE; Supports both amd64 and i386	13 March 2017	1 January 2019
3	Cindy	201808	Stretch (Debian 9)	Cinnamon; Supports both amd64 and i386	31 August 2018	1 July 2020
4	Debbie	—N/a	Buster (Debian 10)	Cinnamon; Supports both amd64 and i386	20 March 2020	1 August 2022
5	Elsie	—N/a	Bullseye (Debian 11)	Cinnamon; Supports both amd64 and i386	20 March 2022	1 July 2024
6	Faye	—N/a	Bookworm (Debian 12)	Cinnamon; Supports both amd64 and i386	27 September 2023	1 January 2026
7	Gigi	—N/a	Trixie (Debian 13)	Cinnamon; Supports amd64	14 October 2025	TBA
Legend: Unsupported Latest version

== See also ==
- List of Linux distributions
