= GNOME 3 =

Third major release of GNOME

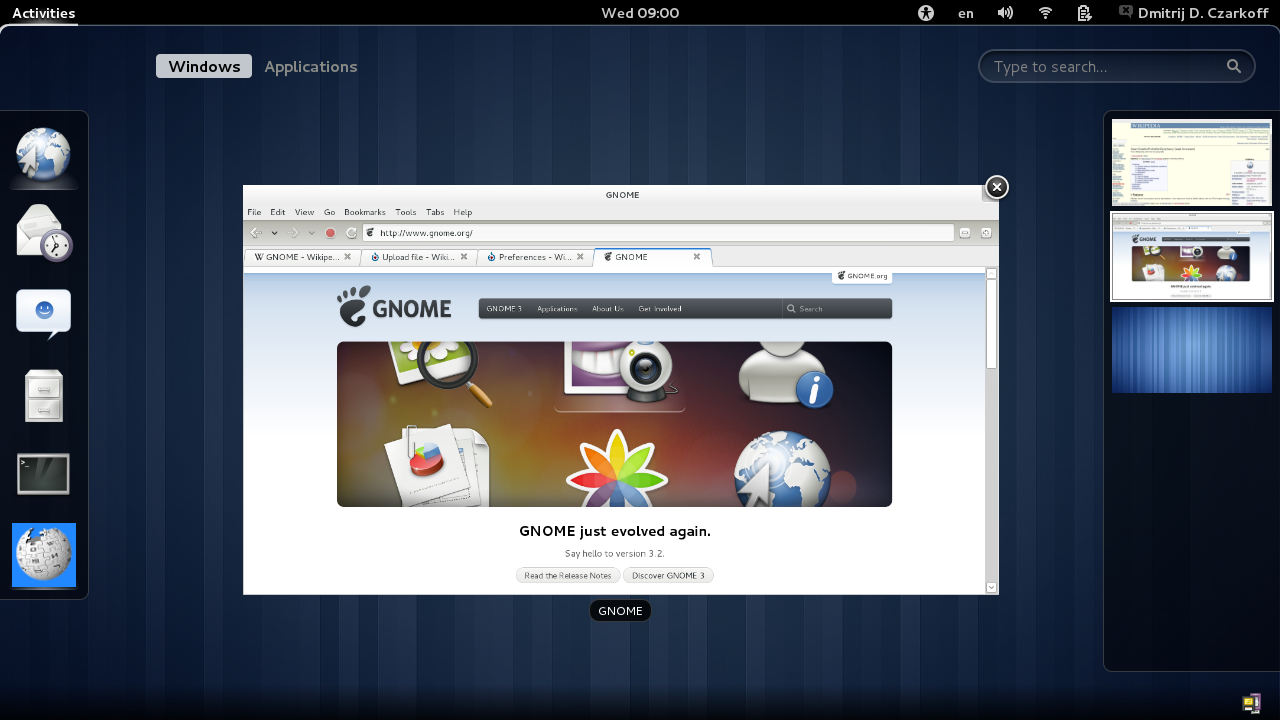
- GNOME 3.2 Activities Overview
- Developer: GNOME Project
- Release: April 6, 2011; 15 years ago
- Final release: 3.38 / September 16, 2020; 6 years ago
- Written in: C
- Operating system: Unix-like
- Platform: GTK
- Predecessor: GNOME 2
- Successor: GNOME 40
- Type: Desktop environment
- License: GPL-2.0-only
- Website: gnome.org (archived at Wayback Machine) or web.archive.org/web/20131229015754/http://www.gnome.org (archived at the Wayback Machine)

GNOME 3 is the third major release of the GNOME desktop environment. A major departure from technologies implemented by its predecessors, GNOME 3 introduced a dramatically different user interface. It was the first GNOME release to utilize a unified graphical shell known as GNOME Shell. It also introduced support for the Wayland display protocol and added integration with other key technologies such as Flatpak during its development lifecycle.

While loose planning began as early as 2004, it was not officially announced until 2008, and received an initial release in 2011. It was superseded by GNOME 40 in 2021.

== Features ==
Much of GNOME 3's user interface changes were based-on attempts at simplification and rethinking of traditional desktop computing workflows. Eschewing the beige colors present in GNOME 2 in favor of a modern black and gray, a new look and feel was implemented, which became known as Adwaita.

Possibly the single-most significant feature change that GNOME 3 introduced was the replacement of the GNOME Panel with the larger-scoped GNOME Shell. With it, came the removal of the desktop metaphor as seen in previous versions in favor of a simple image-based background that distinctly lacks desktop icons. Dropping the Metacity window manager in favor of Mutter, users saw window titlebar decorations do away with maximize and minimize icon buttons.

With the release of GNOME 3.2, shell extensions as a feature, similar to the "applet" of GNOME 2, was added. Such extensions allow developers the ability to add modular, separately-versioned customizations to the desktop environment, without having to integrate code directly into the mainline GNOME codebase.

On September 25, 2013, GNOME 3.10 was released, which introduced support for the Wayland display protocol, as the Mutter window manager added experimental compositing. As the most-used graphical environment for Linux, this set-up a significant change for distributions to eventually be able to switch from the aging X Window System as a default.

GNOME Core Applications took on a unified naming scheme, by utilizing simple, descriptive names such as "Files" instead of "Nautilus" or "Videos" instead of "Totem". Added to the set of core applications in version 3.10 was GNOME Software, which in concert with AppStream metadata, and the PackageKit daemon, serves as a complete app store and system update utility. GNOME 3.18 added integration with the Linux Vendor Firmware Service for hardware vendors to provide firmware updates directly through GNOME Software. GNOME 3.22 integrated GNOME Software with Flatpak. GConf, the system used for storing configuration-related settings in the desktop and applications, was deprecated in GNOME 3, and replaced by GSettings and dconf.

== Development ==
By late 2004, two years into the release of GNOME 2, discussion of the next major release had started occurring. A wiki was posted on the GNOME website that detailed loose brainstorming of compatibility-breaking ideas from project co-founder Federico Mena and several other GNOME contributors.

The community developed the nickname "Project Topaz" for the development effort, as a reference to an acronym of the version phrase "three point zero".

A greater public-facing GNOME 3 discussion began in late May 2005 when Canonical engineer and former GNOME Foundation board director, Jeff Waugh gave a presentation at the sixth annual GUADEC, regarding "Project Topaz". In this presentation, Waugh demonstrated mockups that had been compiled from numerous community ideas, and a brainstorming session occurred thereafter.

Having previously focused on steady incremental growth throughout the desktop environment's development, showcasing dramatic and innovative workflows not currently used in the desktop environment was a controversial subject. In late 2006, GNOME released an official statement that there were no plans for GNOME 3.

In June 2008, Andy Wingo, a GNOME contributor, published an influential article on his personal blog, decrying a stagnating direction of GNOME.

GNOME 3 was officially announced at the 2008 edition of GUADEC.

From October 6-10, 2008, GNOME held a hackathon focused on user experience in Boston. Vincent Untz, part of the release team, noted that designers and developers "tried to forget the current GNOME and see what [they] thought would make sense." As a result of the event, initial mockups were created, and Red Hat agreed to contribute development to the effort.

GNOME 3 pre-releases used a 2.91.x versioning scheme. The first beta version of GNOME 3 was debuted on February 23, 2011.

Having shipped GNOME as its default graphical environment on Ubuntu since its debut, Canonical initially collaborated on development, but eventually became disillusioned, and halted their efforts. This became the catalyst for development of their Unity shell to be used in place of the standard GNOME Shell. Canonical eventually began using a customized version of the GNOME Shell in 2017, when it released Ubuntu 17.10.

Originally scheduled to be released in March 2010, GNOME's release team delayed version 3.0 several times before finally releasing it on April 6, 2011.

== Reception and controversy ==
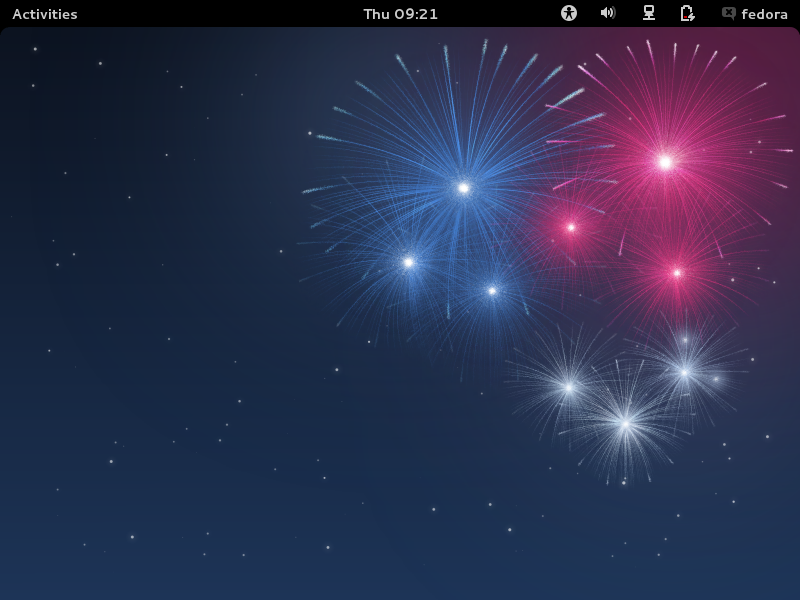
GNOME 3.4 on Fedora 17

GNOME 3 received mixed reception, and the release of GNOME 3 caused considerable controversy in the GNU and Linux communities. Aiming to provide an easy-to-use and uncluttered user experience has led to some criticized design decisions, like the removal of minimize and maximize buttons, the simplification of configuration options, and visual cues that could lead to confusion.

Several projects have been initiated to either continue development of GNOME 2.x, modify GNOME 3.x to be more like the 2.x releases, or create a desktop environment with a traditional design metaphor entirely from scratch due to the negative reception of GNOME 3:

- The MATE desktop environment was forked in August 2011 from the GNOME 2 code-base with the intent of preserving the desktop metaphor associated with GNOME 2 while keeping compatibility with modern Linux-related technologies, such as Wayland, Systemd, PipeWire, and GTK 3.
- The Linux Mint team addressed the issue by developing "Mint GNOME Shell Extensions" that ran on top of GNOME Shell and allowed it to be used via the traditional desktop metaphor. This eventually led to the creation of the Cinnamon desktop environment in 2011, which was forked from the GNOME 3 codebase. Cinnamon became a completely independent desktop environment from GNOME Shell with Cinnamon 2.0 on October 9, 2013.
- The LXDE Project, which was experimenting with a Qt port at the time, merged with the Razor-qt project to form LXQt in 2013. The main developer of LXDE, Hong Jen Lee, cited that the reason he wanted to port LXDE to Qt was due to dissatification with the memory and CPU consumption of GNOME libraries when testing a GTK 3 version of LXDE. Hong eventually posted a blog post about how an early build of LXQt used less memory than GTK 3 based XFCE.
- Canonical, the company developing Ubuntu, ceased working with the GNOME Shell developers during the GNOME 3 planning phases and released their own desktop environment, Unity, replacing GNOME as the default desktop shell in Ubuntu 11.04 "Natty Narwhal" released in April 2011. Previously, Unity had only been intended for use with the Ubuntu Netbook Edition starting with version 10.10 and a now-canceled edition of Ubuntu called Ubuntu Light. However, Ubuntu has since switched to a modified version of GNOME as of Ubuntu 17.10.
- The Solus Project developed the Budgie desktop environment in response to GNOME 3 in 2014, aiming to provide a simpler and more modern interface. Budgie is built using GTK and GNOME technologies, but offers a different user experience, focusing on providing a lightweight, simple, and elegant user experience.
- The elementaryOS team created the Pantheon desktop environment as a new GTK based desktop environment distinct from GNOME. Built from scratch, Pantheon aims to provide a user-friendly and visually appealing aesthetic, focusing on a cohesive and minimal design, and integrating tightly with the elementaryOS ecosystem.
- System76, an American computer manufacturer selling computer hardware with Linux preinstalled and the creators of a set of GNOME extensions for their own Linux distribution Pop! OS, known collectively as COSMIC, built a new desktop environment of the same name in Rust. The reasons cited by System76 for building a new desktop environment from scratch included limitations with GNOME extensions as well as disagreements with GNOME developers on the desktop experience, such as with supporting server-side decorations in addition to client-side decorations on Wayland. COSMIC will support both client-side and server-side window decorations, unlike GNOME, which only supports the former.

Scott Gilbertson of The Register noted that GNOME 3 represented "shocking changes", but was "cleaner" and "simpler". Ars Technica called the new GNOME Shell a "good starting point for building something even better", and predicted "backlash from users" who would be upset about missing features. Steven Vaughan-Nichols of ZDNet said that it "made GNOME less usable", and that it was a "step backward". However, he later expressed that GNOME 3.4 was a "return to a useful Linux desktop". Lifehacker's Whitson Gordon preferred the stock GNOME 3 desktop environment over Canonical's Unity and other alternatives.

Linus Torvalds, creator of the Linux kernel, publicly expressed his dislike of GNOME 3, and called the version 3.4 release a "total user experience design failure." He abandoned GNOME for a while after the release of GNOME 3.0, saying, "The developers have apparently decided that it's 'too complicated' to actually do real work on your desktop, and have decided to make it really annoying to do". He subsequently switched to Xfce.

Over time, critical reception has grown more positive. In 2013, Torvalds resumed using GNOME, noting that "they have extensions now that are still much too hard to find; but with extensions you can make your desktop look almost as good as it used to look two years ago". Debian, a Linux distribution that had historically used GNOME 2, switched to Xfce when GNOME 3 was released, but re-adopted GNOME 3 in time for the release of Debian 8 "Jessie". Ubuntu switched from Unity to GNOME 3 with several extensions to resemble Unity, such as a persistent left application panel instead of a hidden dock and re-enabling desktop icons, with Ubuntu 17.10 Artful Aardvark in 2017. This release also saw the Ubuntu GNOME edition merge with the mainline release. However, Ubuntu Unity was then released, keeping the Unity desktop and continuing to update it.

== See also ==
- Adwaita (design language) – design language introduced with GNOME 3
- GNOME Shell – the graphical user interface of GNOME 3 and later
