= GNOME Recipes =

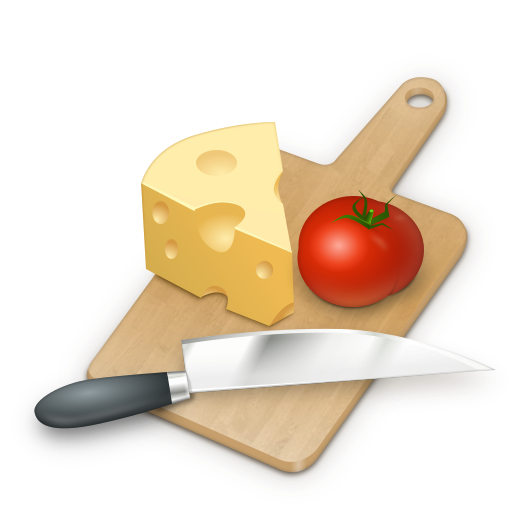
- Original author(s): Matthias Clasen
- Stable release: 2.0.4 / 6 March 2020; 5 years ago
- Repository: gitlab.gnome.org/GNOME/recipes
- Written in: C (GTK)
- Operating system: Linux, Unix-like
- Platform: GNOME
- License: GNU General Public License 3 (GPLv3)
- Website: wiki.gnome.org/Apps/Recipes

GNOME Recipes is a recipe management application for GNOME 3. It is being developed by Matthias Clasen who is known for his work on GTK, Wayland support for GNOME, and other core projects. It replaces the aging Gourmet Recipe Manager.

GNOME Recipes is a collaborative application with a database of recipes that is built up through developer and user contributions.

== Features ==
- Start Cooking: Full screen step by step instructions, with a stop watch for cooking and baking times
- Buy ingredients & Shopping list
- Classification by Cuisine including American, Chinese, Indian, Middle Eastern, etc.
- Classification by special occasions such as Thanksgiving or Christmas
