= POPOS =

Popos, POPOS or variants may refer to:

- Privately owned public space, a type of privately owned public open space
- Pop! OS, a Linux distribution
