= Ubuntu GNOME =

Discontinued Linux distribution

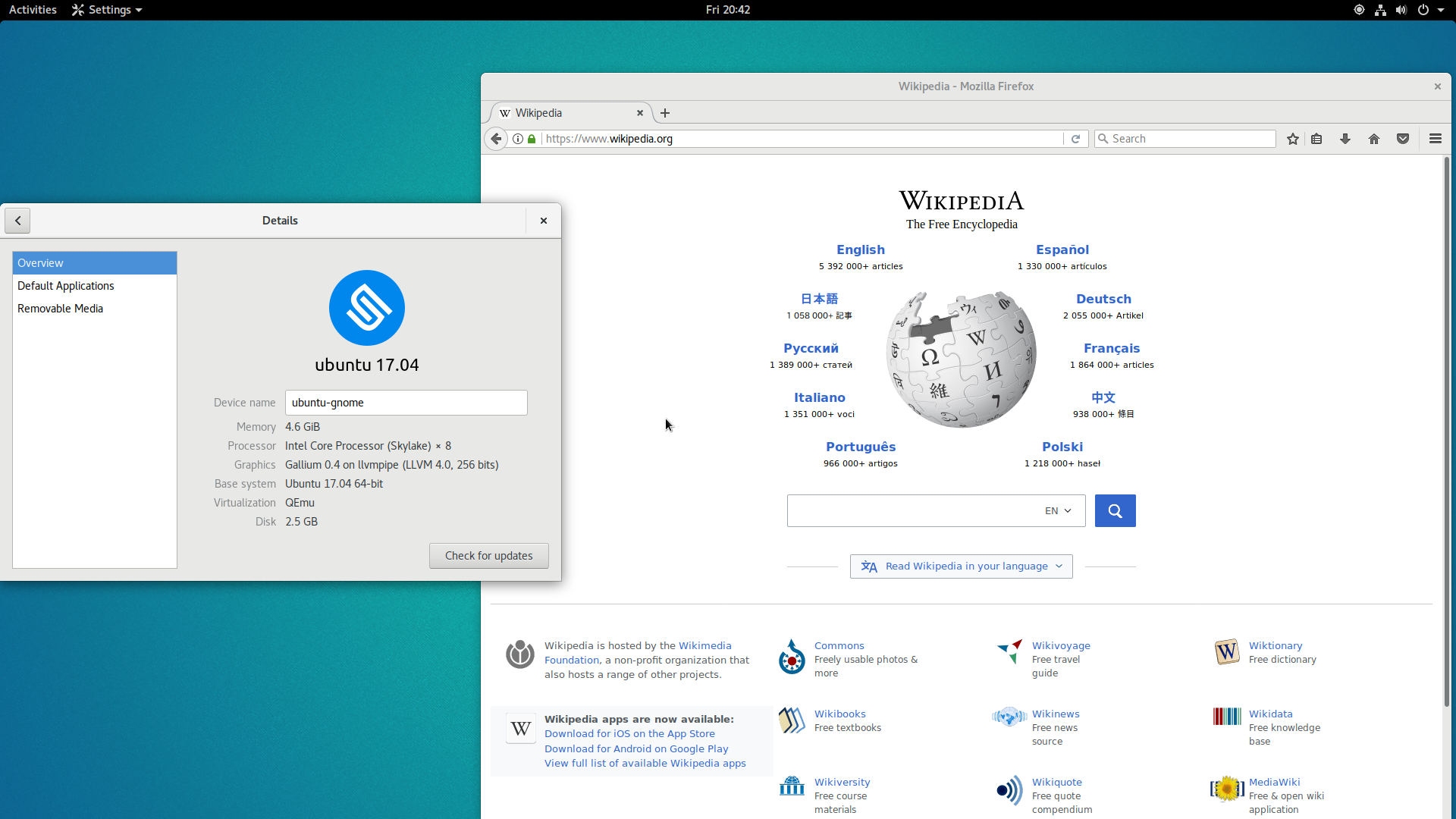
- Ubuntu GNOME 17.04
- OS family: Linux (Unix-like)
- Working state: Discontinued in favor of the standard Ubuntu distribution
- Source model: Open source
- Initial release: 18 October 2012; 13 years ago
- Final release: Ubuntu GNOME 17.04 (Zesty Zapus) / 13 April 2017
- Available in: Multilingual
- Package manager: dpkg
- Kernel type: Monolithic (Linux)
- Userland: GNU
- Default user interface: GNOME Shell
- License: Free software licenses (mainly GPL)
- Official website: ubuntugnome.org

Ubuntu GNOME (formerly Ubuntu GNOME Remix) is a discontinued Linux distribution, distributed as free and open-source software. It used a pure GNOME 3 desktop environment with GNOME Shell, rather than the Unity graphical shell. Starting with version 13.04 it became an official "flavour" of the Ubuntu operating system.

In April 2017, it was announced that 17.04 would be the last release. The distribution was to be discontinued in favor of the standard Ubuntu distribution, which switched from using Unity to GNOME Shell as its desktop environment starting with its 17.10 release.

== History ==
The project began as an unofficial "remix" because some users preferred the GNOME 3 desktop environment over Unity. Ubuntu GNOME 12.10 Quantal Quetzal was the first stable version, released on 18 October 2012.

Writing in October 2013, Jim Lynch stated:

"Ubuntu GNOME 13.10 will be welcomed by GNOME fans. GNOME 3.8 adds some significant new features that enhance the desktop experience, and all of it has been combined well with Ubuntu 13.10 itself. So the end result will probably be quite appealing for those who want Ubuntu, but with GNOME 3.8 instead of Unity. If you are not a fan of GNOME 3 then Lubuntu, Kubuntu or Xubuntu are much better desktop environments if you need to stay within the Ubuntu family. If none of those appeal to you then you might want to just sit tight and wait for Linux Mint 16 to arrive."

Jim Lynch reviewed Ubuntu GNOME 14.04 LTS again in April 2014 and concluded:

"I have seen some reviews of regular Ubuntu 14.04 that have proclaimed it to be "the best version of Ubuntu yet" and that sort of thing. Well, I think it's fair to say that Ubuntu GNOME 14.04 may also be the finest version of Ubuntu GNOME as well, and that's something that the Ubuntu GNOME developers and users can take pride in."

On 5 April 2017, Canonical Executive Chairman and Ubuntu founder Mark Shuttleworth announced that the mainline version of Ubuntu would move from Unity to the GNOME 3 desktop starting by version 18.04 LTS, which would make it virtually identical to Ubuntu GNOME. It was later revealed that Ubuntu 17.10 would in fact be the first version to use GNOME.

Shuttleworth wrote on 8 April 2017, "We will invest in Ubuntu GNOME with the intent of delivering a fantastic all-GNOME desktop. We're helping the Ubuntu GNOME team, not creating something different or competitive with that effort. While I am passionate about the design ideas in Unity and hope GNOME may be more open to them now, I think we should respect the GNOME design leadership by delivering GNOME the way GNOME wants it delivered. Our role in that, as usual, will be to make sure that upgrades, integration, security, performance and the full experience are fantastic."

In light of Ubuntu's announcement that it would switch desktop environments from Unity to GNOME, the Ubuntu GNOME developers announced on 13 April 2017 that the distribution would merge into the mainline Ubuntu, starting with the 17.10 release.

== Releases ==
Version	Code Name	Release date	Supported Until	Kernel	Gnome Version	Remarks
12.10	Quantal Quetzal	2012-10-18	May 2014	3.5.0	3.4	First release
13.04	Raring Ringtail	2013-04-26	January 2014	3.8.0	3.6	Firefox replaced GNOME Web (Epiphany) as the default browser.; Ubuntu Software Center and Update Manager replaced GNOME Software (gnome-packagekit).; LibreOffice 4.0 became available by default instead of AbiWord and Gnumeric.
13.10	Saucy Salamander	2013-10-17	July 2014	3.11	3.8	GNOME 3.8
14.04 LTS	Trusty Tahr	2014-04-17	April 2017	3.13	3.10	Release as a long-term support (LTS) for three years; Included a "GNOME Classic" session available by default in the session menu
14.10	Utopic Unicorn	2014-10-23	July 2015	3.16	3.12	Most of GNOME 3.12 was included; gnome-maps and gnome-weather were installed by default; GNOME Classic session was included and selectable at log-in
15.04	Vivid Vervet	2015-04-23	February 2016	3.19	3.14	GNOME 3.14
15.10	Wily Werewolf	2015-10-22	July 2016	4.2	3.16	GNOME 3.16; GNOME Photos replaced Shotwell as the default photo manager; GNOME Music replaced Rhythmbox as default music player
16.04 LTS	Xenial Xerus	2016-04-21	April 2019	4.4	3.18	"Getting Started Guide" upon first boot; GNOME Software replaces the Ubuntu Software Center; Support for installing Snap packages; Wayland session available (experimental)
16.10	Yakkety Yak	2016-10-13	July 2017	4.8	3.20	
17.04	Zesty Zapus	2017-04-13	January 2018	4.10	3.24	Final release

== See also ==
- Ubuntu Unity
- Comparison of Linux distributions
