= COSMIC desktop =

Desktop environment for Linux

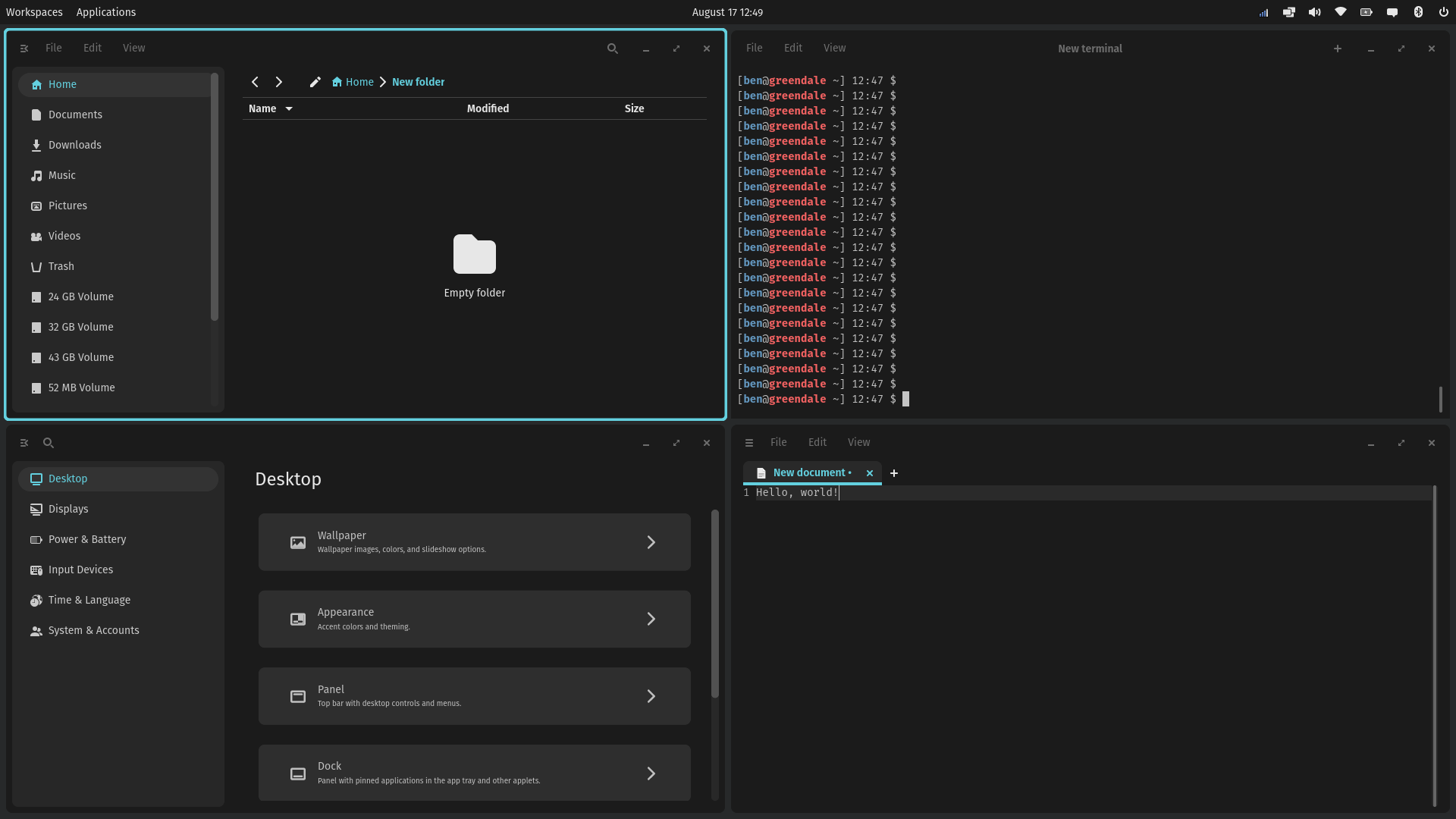
- The first alpha release, showcasing various apps
- Original author: System76
- Developer: System76
- Release: August 5, 2024; 23 months ago
- Stable release: 1.2.0 / 1 July 2026; 12 days ago
- Written in: Rust
- Operating system: Linux
- Platform: Wayland
- Type: Desktop environment
- License: GPL-3.0-or-later
- Website: system76.com/cosmic
- Repository: github.com/pop-os/cosmic-epoch

COSMIC (Note: Officially an acronym for Computer Operating System Main Interface Components) is a free and open-source desktop environment and Wayland compositor for Linux. Originally a modified version of GNOME made for Pop! OS, it was later rebuilt from scratch as a standalone desktop environment using the Iced toolkit. It supports stacking and tiling windows and every window can act as a tab.

== History ==
Computer manufacturer System76 announced in 2021 that it would be creating a new desktop environment, not based on any existing software. This desktop environment would be written in Rust and developed to be similar to GNOME. System76 cited limitations with GNOME extensions, as well as disagreements with GNOME developers on the desktop experience, as reasons to build a new desktop environment.

The first alpha release, branded as "Epoch," released on 8 August 2024.

The second Epoch alpha released on 24 September 2024. It added more pages to the Settings application which was unfinished in the first alpha, as well as several features for the file manager.

The third alpha released on 31 October 2024. This release introduced multiple connectivity features, including the ability to connect to wireless networks and Bluetooth devices from the built-in COSMIC Settings application.

The fourth alpha released on 4 December 2024, introducing region and language settings, COSMIC Store improvements, and accessibility features.

The fifth alpha released on 9 January 2025, adding a Users page to the settings application, and some minor UI improvements. It also introduced a media player.

The sixth alpha released on 21 February 2025, adding improvements to settings such as desktop icons, the launcher, and scaling, as well as introducing various memory optimizations.

The seventh alpha released on 24 April 2025, adding improvements to desktop workspace management, new accessibility features, and global application shortcuts.

The first beta was released on 26 September 2025.

Pop!_OS 24.04 LTS, featuring the new Rust-based COSMIC desktop as its default environment, was officially released on 11 December 2025. The release followed Ubuntu 24.04 LTS and marked the first stable deployment of COSMIC, introducing core applications such as Files, Store, and Terminal built specifically for the new desktop environment.

== Features ==
COSMIC is made from scratch and is not based on any existing desktop environment. It features a custom theming system, uses the Rust-based Iced graphics toolkit and its own applications (a text editor, a terminal emulator, a file manager, a settings application, an app store, and a media player).

=== COSMIC Edit ===
COSMIC Edit is the built-in text editor. It supports bidirectional text, ligatures, emoji, and more. It also has programming-oriented features such as line highlighting and Git integration.

=== COSMIC Terminal ===
COSMIC Terminal is the built-in terminal emulator. It was built using code from the terminal Alacritty and a custom renderer. It supports bidirectional text, theming, and GPU rendering.

=== COSMIC Files ===
COSMIC Files is the built-in file manager. It includes standard file manager functionality as well as keyboard shortcuts, built-in file archiving functions, and a file preview feature.

=== COSMIC Store ===
COSMIC Store is the built-in application center. It gives users an all-in-one solution to browse and install/update/remove apps from Flathub. It also provides a convenient way to update the system components.

=== COSMIC Settings ===
COSMIC Settings is the built-in configuration app that allows users to customize the desktop environment to their preferences. It includes a search bar to quickly find specific settings without browsing through menus.

=== COSMIC Media Player ===
COSMIC Media Player is the default media player. It uses Vulkan for rendering and VA-API for decoding.
