= Mutter (software) =

GNOME window manager and display server

- Developer: GNOME Project
- Release: April 2011; 15 years ago
- Stable release: 50.4 / 4 August 2026; 3 months ago
- Written in: C
- Operating system: Unix-like
- Size: 218.0 kB (amd64 installed size on debian)
- Type: Wayland compositor; X window manager
- License: GPL-2.0-or-later
- Website: mutter.gnome.org
- Repository: gitlab.gnome.org/GNOME/mutter

Mutter is a display server and window manager for the Wayland protocol ("compositor"). It is the default window manager for GNOME.

Mutter was initially a compositing window manager designed and implemented for the X Window System, but then evolved to be a Wayland compositor. It became the default window manager in GNOME 3, replacing Metacity, which used GTK for rendering. The name "Mutter" is a combination of "Metacity" and "Clutter".

== Window management ==
Mutter can function as a standalone window manager for GNOME-like desktops, and serves as the primary window manager for the GNOME Shell, which is an integral part of GNOME since version 3. Mutter is extensible with plug-ins, and supports numerous visual effects. GNOME Shell is written as a plug-in to Mutter.

== Release history ==
- Support for HiDPI was added to version 3.13 of Mutter by Adel Gadllah.
- In version 3.13.2 logind integration replaced mutter-launch.
- In version 3.13.3 (June 24, 2014) the server side bits of wl_touch_interface were implemented by Carlos Garnacho.
- Support for X11 was disabled at compile-time in GNOME 49 and officially dropped with the X11 session code removed GNOME 50, rendering Mutter exclusively a Wayland compositor. GNOME 49 and later can still run most X11 apps on the Wayland session via XWayland.

== Forks ==
=== Muffin ===
Muffin is a fork of Mutter by the Linux Mint team for their Cinnamon desktop environment. Cinnamon's shell, a fork of GNOME Shell, is written as a plugin for Muffin.
