= Pop! OS =

Linux distribution developed by System76

Pop!_OS

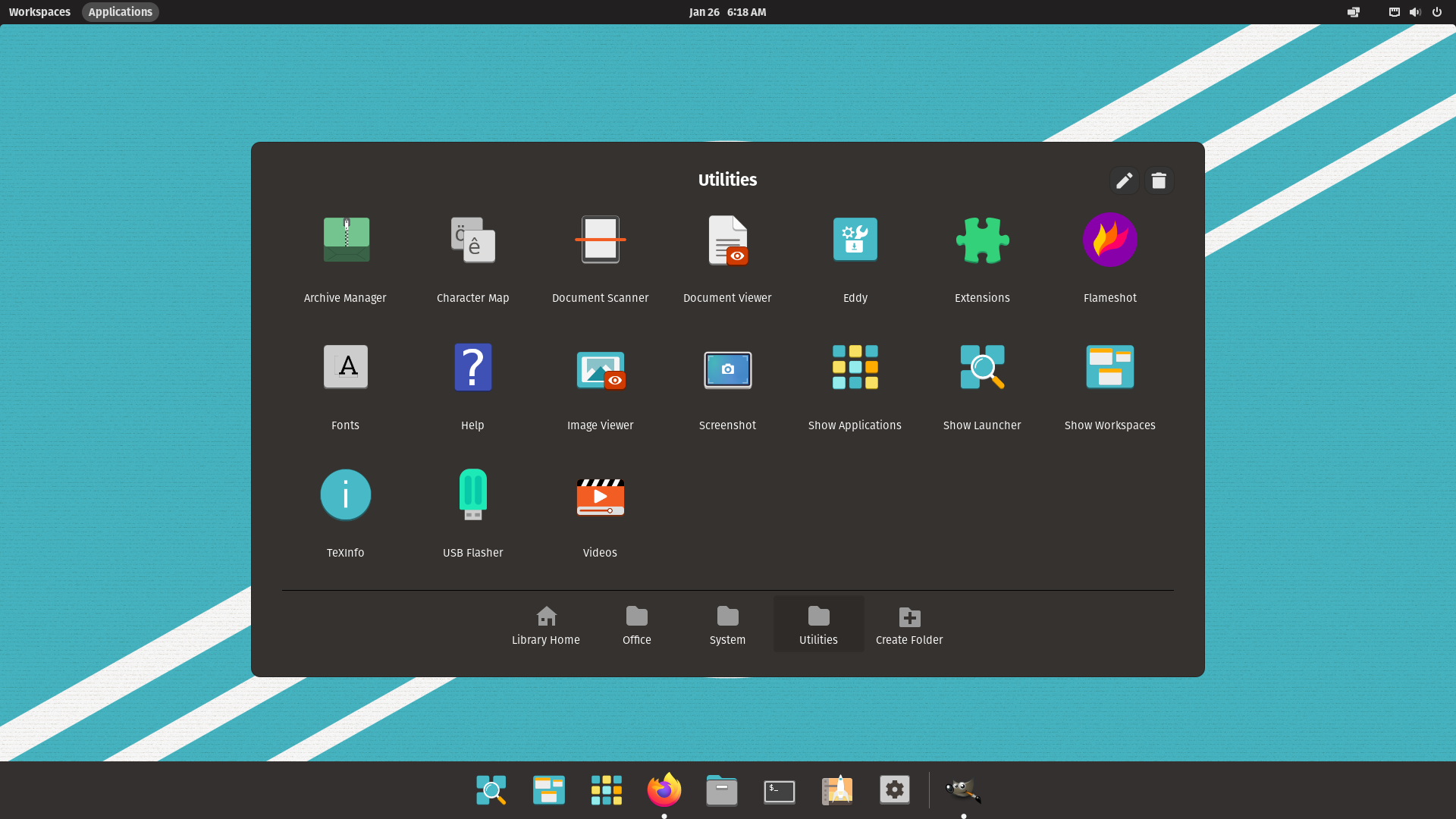
- Pop!_OS 21.10, with the pre-standalone COSMIC desktop
- Developer: System76
- OS family: Unix-like (Linux kernel)
- Working state: Current
- Source model: Open source
- Initial release: October 27, 2017; 8 years ago
- Latest release: Interim: / LTS: 24.04 LTS / 11 December 2025; 7 months ago
- Repository: github.com/pop-os
- Update method: APT (+ Pop!_Shop User Interface)
- Package manager: APT (command-line frontend); dpkg (backend); Pop!_Shop (GUI); Flatpak
- Supported platforms: x86-64
- Kernel type: Monolithic (Linux kernel)
- Userland: GNU
- Default user interface: COSMIC
- Official website: pop.system76.com

Pop OS (stylized as Pop!_OS) is a free and open-source Linux distribution based on Ubuntu and developed by the American Linux computer manufacturer System76. It features the COSMIC desktop environment, a Rust-based and Wayland-only desktop created and maintained by System76. Pop!_OS is primarily designed to ship with the company’s computers, but it can also be downloaded and installed on most PCs.

Pop!_OS provides full out-of-the-box support for both AMD and Nvidia GPUs. Pop!_OS provides default disk encryption, streamlined window and workspace management, keyboard shortcuts for navigation as well as built-in power management profiles. The latest releases also have packages that allow for easy setup for TensorFlow and CUDA.

Pop!_OS is maintained primarily by System76, with the release version source code hosted in a GitHub repository. Unlike many other Linux distributions, it is not community-driven, although outside programmers can contribute, view and modify the source code. They can also build custom ISO images and redistribute them under another name.

== Features ==
Pop!_OS primarily uses free software, with some proprietary software used for hardware drivers for Wi-Fi, discrete GPU and media codecs. It comes with a wide range of default software, including LibreOffice, Firefox and Geary. Additional software can be downloaded using the COSMIC Store application, or on older versions, the Pop!_Shop package manager.

Pop!_OS uses APT as its package manager and initially did not use Snaps or Flatpak, but Flatpak support was added in version 20.04 LTS. Software packages are available from the Ubuntu repositories, as well as Pop!_OS's own repositories. Pop!_OS features the Cosmic Desktop, a custom interface made with Rust, with a Pop!_OS theme.

There is a GUI toggle in the GNOME system menu for switching between different video modes on dual GPU laptops. There are four display modes: hybrid, discrete, compute, and iGPU only.

There is also a power management package developed from the Intel Clear Linux distribution. Pop!_OS currently uses the desktop environment COSMIC which is wayland-exclusive.

TensorFlow and CUDA enabled programs can be added by installing packages from the Pop!_OS repositories without additional configuration required.

It provides a Recovery Partition that can be used to 'refresh' the system while preserving user files. It can be used only if it is set up during initial installation.

From the 21.04 release, Pop!_OS included a GNOME-based desktop environment with custom GNOME extensions developed by System76, called COSMIC, an acronym for "Computer Operating System Main Interface Components" developed by System76. It featured separate views for workspaces and applications, a dock included by default, and supports both mouse-driven and keyboard-driven workflows.

From the 24.04 release, System76 switched from COSMIC using custom extensions on top of GNOME into making COSMIC a true standalone desktop environment of its own. This desktop environment is written in Rust and developed to be similar to GNOME. System76 cites limitations with GNOME extensions, as well as disagreements with GNOME developers on the desktop experience as reasons to build a new desktop environment.

== Installation ==
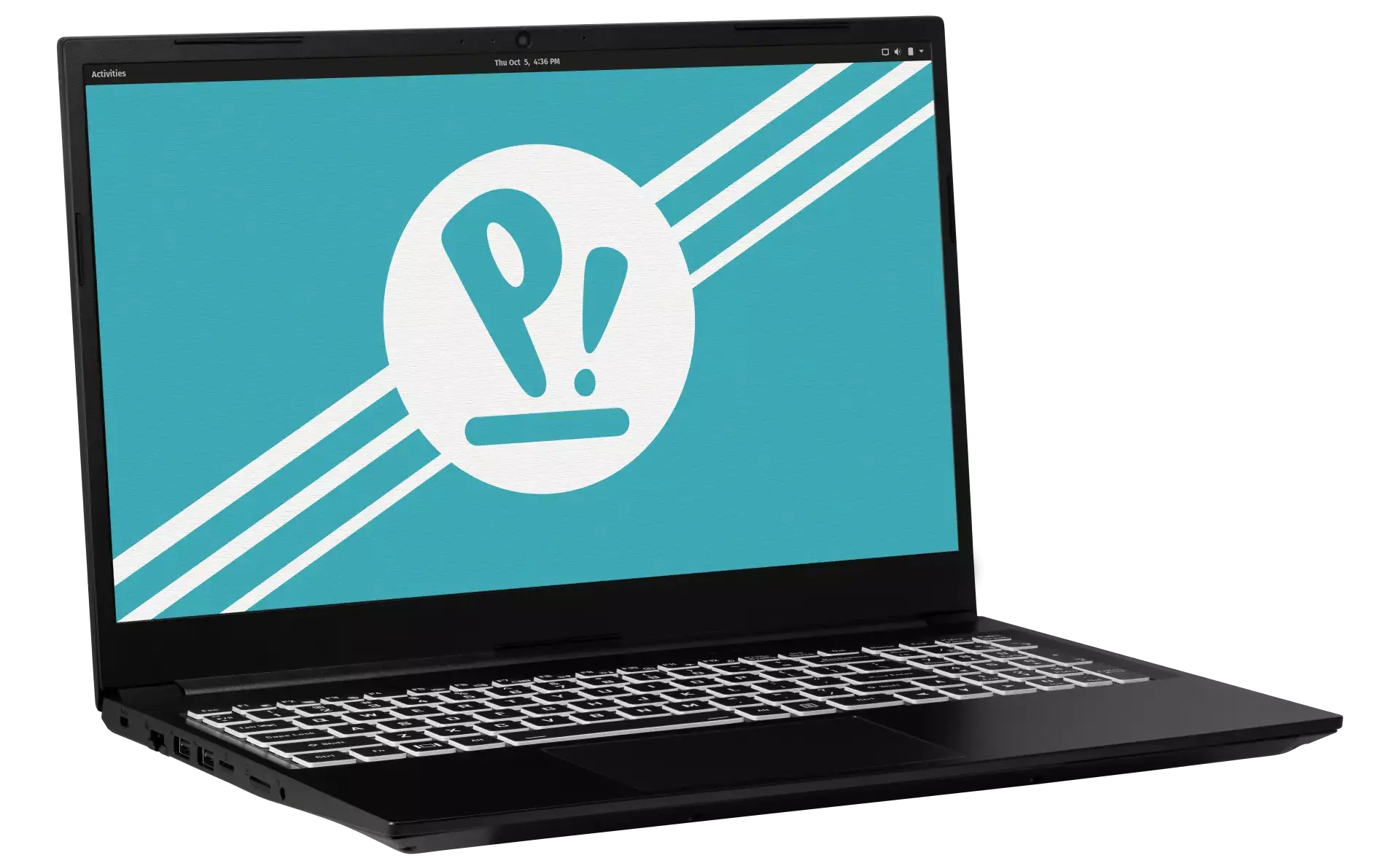
Pop!_OS running on a System76 Pangolin laptop. Pop!_OS is the default operating system option for all System76 computers.

Pop!_OS provides three ISO images for download: one with no proprietary video drivers, which supports AMD and Intel GPUs, another with Nvidia drivers, and another for the Raspberry Pi 4, called Pop!_Pi. The appropriate ISO file may be downloaded and written to either a USB flash drive or a DVD using tools such as Etcher or UNetbootin.

Pop!_OS initially used Ubiquity. Later it switched to a custom installer built in partnership with elementary OS.

== Release history ==
=== 17.10 ===
Prior to offering Pop!_OS, System76 had shipped all its computers with Ubuntu pre-installed. Development of Pop!_OS was commenced in 2017 after Ubuntu decided to halt development of Unity and move back to GNOME as its desktop environment. The first release of Pop!_OS was 17.10, based upon Ubuntu 17.10. In a blog post explaining the decision to build the new distribution, the company stated that there was a need for a desktop-first distribution. The first release was a customized version of Ubuntu GNOME, with mostly visual differences. Some different default applications were supplied and some settings were changed. The initial Pop theme was a fork of the Adapta GTK theme, plus other upstream projects. 17.10 also introduced the Pop!_Shop software store, which is a fork of the elementary OS app store.

Bertel King of Make Use Of reviewed version 17.10, in November 2017 and noted, "System76 isn't merely taking Ubuntu and slapping a different name on it." King generally praised the release but did fault the "visual inconsistencies" between applications that were optimized for the distribution and those that were not and the application store, Pop!_Shop, as incomplete. For users who may want to try it on existing hardware he concluded, "Now that Ubuntu 17.10 has embraced GNOME, that's one less reason to install Pop!_OS over Ubuntu."

=== 18.04 LTS ===
Version 18.04 added power profiles; providing easy GPU switching, especially for Nvidia Optimus equipped laptops; HiDPI support; full-disk encryption and access to the Pop!_OS repository.

In 2018, reviewer Phillip Prado described Pop!_OS 18.04 as "a beautiful looking Linux distribution". He concluded, "Overall, I think Pop!_OS is a fantastic distribution that most people could really enjoy if they opened up their workflow to something they may or may not be used to. It is clean, fast, and well-developed. Which I think is exactly what System 76 was going for here."

=== 18.10 ===
Release 18.10 was released in October 2018. It included a new Linux kernel, graphic stack, theme changes, and updated applications, along with improvements to the Pop!_Shop software store.

=== 19.04 ===
Version 19.04 was mostly an incremental update, corresponding to the same Ubuntu version. It incorporated a "Slim Mode" option to maximize screen space, by reducing the height of application window headers, a new dark mode for nighttime use, and a new icon set.

Joey Sneddon of OMG! Ubuntu! reviewed Pop!_OS 19.04 in April 2019 and wrote, "I don't see any appreciable value in Pop OS. Certainly, nothing that would make me recommend it over regular Ubuntu 19.04 ..."

=== 19.10 ===
In addition to incremental updates, version 19.10 introduced Tensorman, a custom TensorFlow toolchain management tool, multilingual support and a new theme based on Adwaita.

In a 2019 comparison between Pop!_OS and Ubuntu, Ankush Das of It's FOSS found that while both distributions have their advantages, "the overall color scheme, icons, and the theme that goes on in Pop!_OS is arguably more pleasing as a superior user experience."

=== 20.04 LTS ===
Pop!_OS 20.04 LTS was released on 30 April 2020 and is based upon Ubuntu 20.04 LTS. It introduced selectable auto-tiling, expanded keyboard shortcuts, and workspace management. It also added Pop!_Shop application store support for Flatpak and introduced a "hybrid graphics mode" for laptops, allowing operation using the power-saving Intel GPU and then providing switching to the NVidia GPU for applications that require it. Firmware updates became automatic and operating system updates could be downloaded and later applied while off-line.

In examining Pop!_OS 20.04 beta, FOSS Linux editor, Divya Kiran Kumar noted, "with its highly effective workspaces, advanced window management, ample keyboard shortcuts, out-of-the-box disk encryption, and myriad pre-installed apps. It would be an excellent pick for anyone hoping to use their time and effort effectively."

Jason Evangelho reviewed Pop!_OS in FOSS Linux January 2020 and pronounced it the best Ubuntu-based distribution.

A review of Pop!_OS 20.04 by Ankush Das in It's FOSS in May 2020 termed it "the best Ubuntu-based distribution" and concluded, "with the window tiling feature, flatpak support, and numerous other improvements, my experience with Pop!_OS 20.04 has been top-notch so far."

OMG! Ubuntu! reviewer Joey Sneddon wrote of Pop!_OS 20.04, "It kinda revolutionizes the entire user experience". He further noted, "The fact this distro doesn't shy away from indulging power users, and somehow manages to make it work for everyone, underlines why so-called 'fragmentation' isn't a bad thing: it's a chameleonic survival skill that allows Linux to adapt to whatever the task requires. It is the T-1000 of computing if you get the reference. And I can't lie: Ubuntu could really learn a few things from this approach."

A 19 October 2020 review in FOSS Bytes by Mohammed Abubakar termed it, "The Best Ubuntu-based Distro!" and said it is, "an Ubuntu-based Linux distro that strikes a perfect balance between being beginner-friendly and professional or gaming use".

=== 20.10 ===
Pop!_OS 20.10 was released on 23 October 2020 and is based upon Ubuntu 20.10. It introduced stackable tiled windows and floating window exceptions in auto-tiling mode. Fractional scaling was also introduced, as well as external monitor support for hybrid graphics.

Beta News reviewer Brian Fagioli in particular praised the availability of fractional scaling and stacking and noted "what the company does with Pop!_OS, essentially, is improve upon Ubuntu with tweaks and changes to make it even more user friendly. Ultimately, Pop!_OS has become much better than the operating system on which it is based."

=== 21.04 ===
Pop!_OS 21.04 was released on 29 June 2021 and is based on Ubuntu 21.04. It included the COSMIC (Computer Operating System Main Interface Components) desktop, based on GNOME, but with a custom dock and shortcut controls.

Writing in OMG Ubuntu, Joey Sneddon noted, "COSMIC puts a dock on the desktop; separates workspace and applications into individually accessible screens; adds a new keyboard-centric app launcher (that isn't trying to search all the things™ by default); plumbs in some much-needed touchpad gestures; and — as if all of that wasn't enough — makes further refinements to its unique window tiling extension (which you're free to toggle on/off at any point)." He continued, "Pop!_OS 21.04 is sort of what Ubuntu could — some might say 'should' — be: a distro that doesn't patronise its potential users by fixating on an idealised use case drawn up in a meeting. COSMIC wants to help its users work more efficiently on their terms, not impose a predetermined workflow upon them."

=== 21.10 ===
Pop!_OS 21.10 was released on 14 December 2021 and is based upon Ubuntu 21.10. It included GNOME 40, a new "Vertical Overview" extension, a new Applications menu, and support for Raspberry Pi.

=== 22.04 LTS ===
Pop!_OS 22.04 was released on 25 April 2022 and is based upon Ubuntu 22.04 LTS, which is based on Debian. It includes GNOME 42 base with System76 COSMIC UX. The ability to update and upgrade Pop!_OS automatically was added to the OS Upgrade & Recovery panel in Settings (Supports: Debian, Flatpak, and Nix packages).

A new support panel has been added to the bottom of the settings menu. This panel gives quick access to troubleshooting resources for Pop!_OS. The ability to add a separate background for dark mode and light mode has been added. Pop!_Shop has been significantly renovated. Changes include: improvements to backend code, improved reliability for package operations (update, install, etc.), UI improvements to aid in allowing small window sizes for tiling, update and install buttons now also function as a progress bar and a new "recently updated" homepage section highlighting newly added or updated applications.

=== 24.04 LTS ===
Pop!_OS 24.04 LTS was released on 11 December 2025 and is based upon Ubuntu 24.04 LTS, which is based on Debian. It uses the new COSMIC DE, developed by System76.

== Release table ==
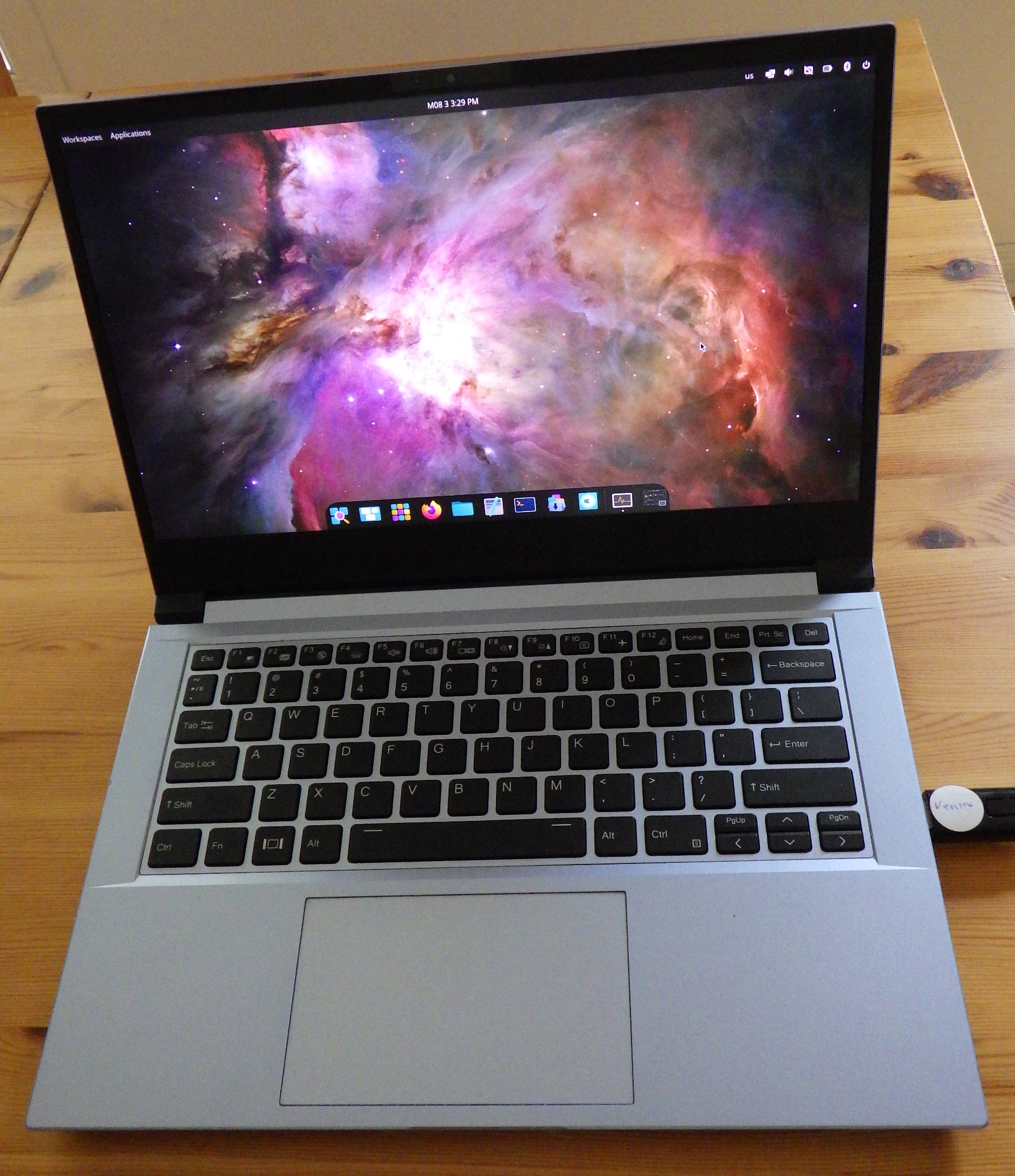
A System76 Galago Pro 5 (galp5) laptop computer running Pop! OS 24.04 Alpha 7

Pop!_OS is based upon Ubuntu and its release cycle is the same as Ubuntu, with new releases every six months in April and October. Long-term support releases are made every two years, in April of even-numbered years. Each non-LTS release is supported for three months after the release of the next version, and LTS releases are supported for five years. However, after the release of Pop!_OS 22.04, System76 announced that they will be skipping the release of 22.10 to better focus their resources in the development of COSMIC DE based on Rust.

Release history
Version	Release date	General support until	Based on
17.10	2017-10-27	n/a	Ubuntu 17.10
18.04 LTS	2018-04-30	2023-04	Ubuntu 18.04 LTS
18.10	2018-10-19	2019-07	Ubuntu 18.10
19.04	2019-04-20	2020-01	Ubuntu 19.04
19.10	2019-10-19	2020-07	Ubuntu 19.10
20.04 LTS	2020-04-30	2025-04	Ubuntu 20.04 LTS
20.10	2020-10-23	2021-07	Ubuntu 20.10
21.04	2021-06-29	2022-01-22	Ubuntu 21.04
21.10	2021-12-14	2022-07	Ubuntu 21.10
22.04 LTS	2022-04-25	2027-04	Ubuntu 22.04 LTS
24.04 LTS	2025-12-11	Current Release	Ubuntu 24.04 LTS
Legend: Unsupported Supported Latest version Preview version Future version

== See also ==
- Debian
- List of Ubuntu-based distributions
