= System76 =

Computer manufacturer using free software

Coordinates: 39.774010°N 104.828659°W

System76 Inc.
- Type: Private
- Industry: Computer hardware
- Founded: 2005; 21 years ago
- Headquarters: Denver, Colorado, United States
- Area served: Worldwide
- Key people: Carl Richell (CEO)
- Products: Desktops, netbooks, notebooks, servers
- Website: system76.com

System76, Inc. is an American computer manufacturer based in Denver, Colorado, that sells notebook computers, desktop computers, and servers. The company utilizes free and open-source software, and offers a choice of Ubuntu or their own Ubuntu-based Linux distribution Pop!_OS as preinstalled operating systems.

== History ==
System76 was founded by Carl Richell and Erik Fetzer. In 2003, Fetzer registered the domain system76.com to sell computers with Linux operating systems preinstalled, but the idea was not pursued until two years later. The number 76 in the company name is a reference to 1776, the year the American Revolution took place. Richell explained that the company hoped to spark an "open source revolution", giving consumers a choice to not use proprietary software.

In mid-2005, the founders considered which Linux distribution to offer, with Red Hat Enterprise Linux, openSUSE, Yoper and other distributions evaluated. Ubuntu was initially dismissed, but Richell and Fetzer changed their mind quickly after a re-evaluation. Richell liked Canonical's business model of completely free software, backed by commercial support when needed. The first computers sold by System76 shipped with Ubuntu 5.10 Breezy Badger preinstalled.

In response to Canonical switching to the GNOME desktop from the Unity interface for future releases of Ubuntu in May 2017, System76 announced a new shell called Pop. The company announced in June 2017 that it would be creating its own Linux distribution based on Ubuntu called Pop!_OS.

System76 began manufacturing their Thelio line of desktops in 2018 at a factory in Denver, Colorado. The company moved into a 24,000-square-foot warehouse.

== Products ==
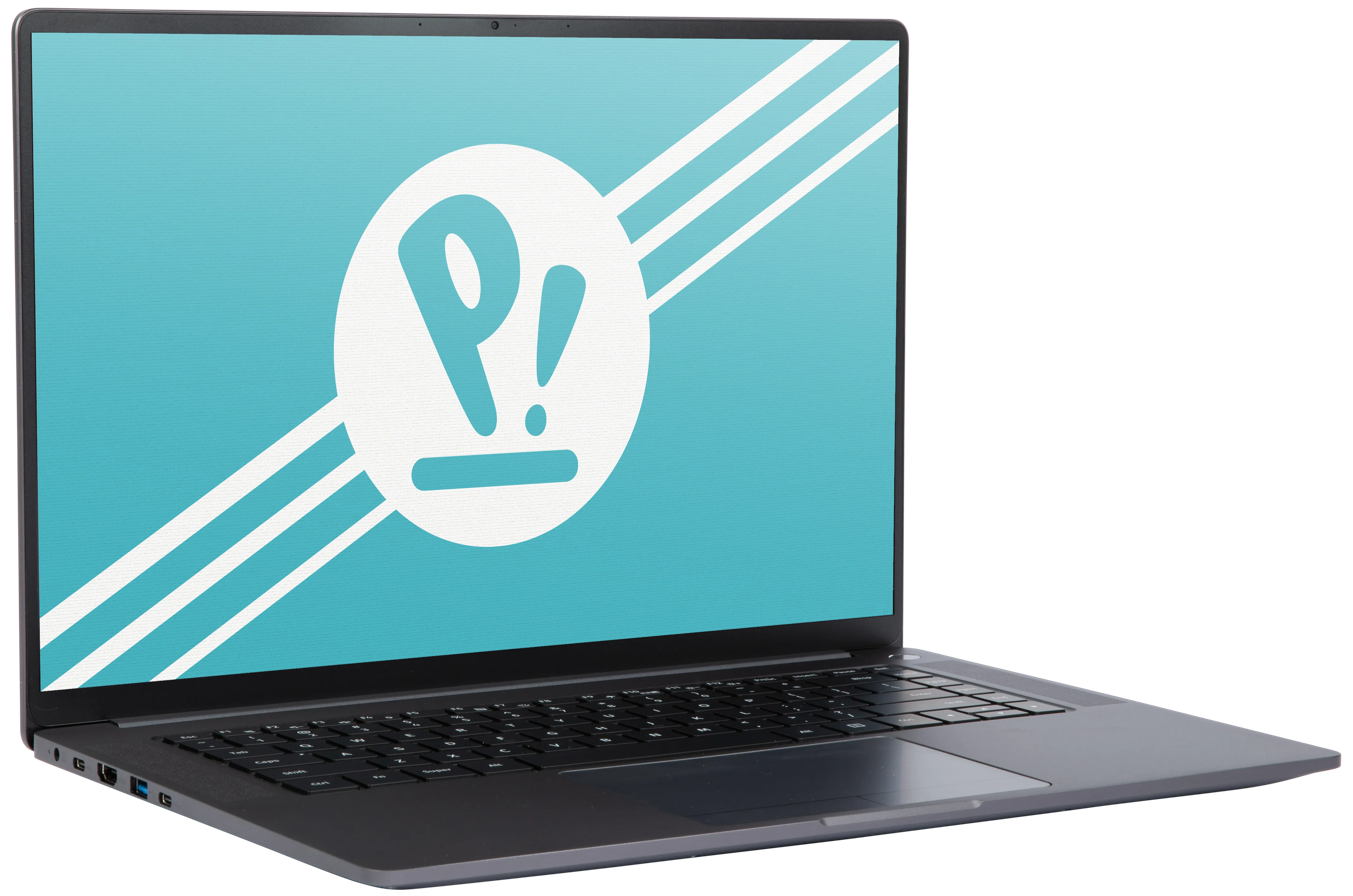
The 2024 model of System76 Pangolin, an ultraportable laptop series

System76's products include the Thelio series of desktops, the Meerkat mini computer, several laptops, and several rack mount servers. The computers are shipped with Pop! OS, the company's in-house Linux distribution.

System76's computer models are named after various African animals.

In May 2021, the company released the Launch series of mechanical keyboards, which feature the open source QMK firmware and built-in USB hubs.

System76's firmware partly disables the Intel Management Engine; the Intel Management Engine is proprietary firmware which runs an operating system in post-2008 Intel chipsets.

On 4 April 2023, System76's CEO and founder Carl Richell announced System76's first in-house designed laptop, code-named "Virgo".

=== Pop!_OS ===
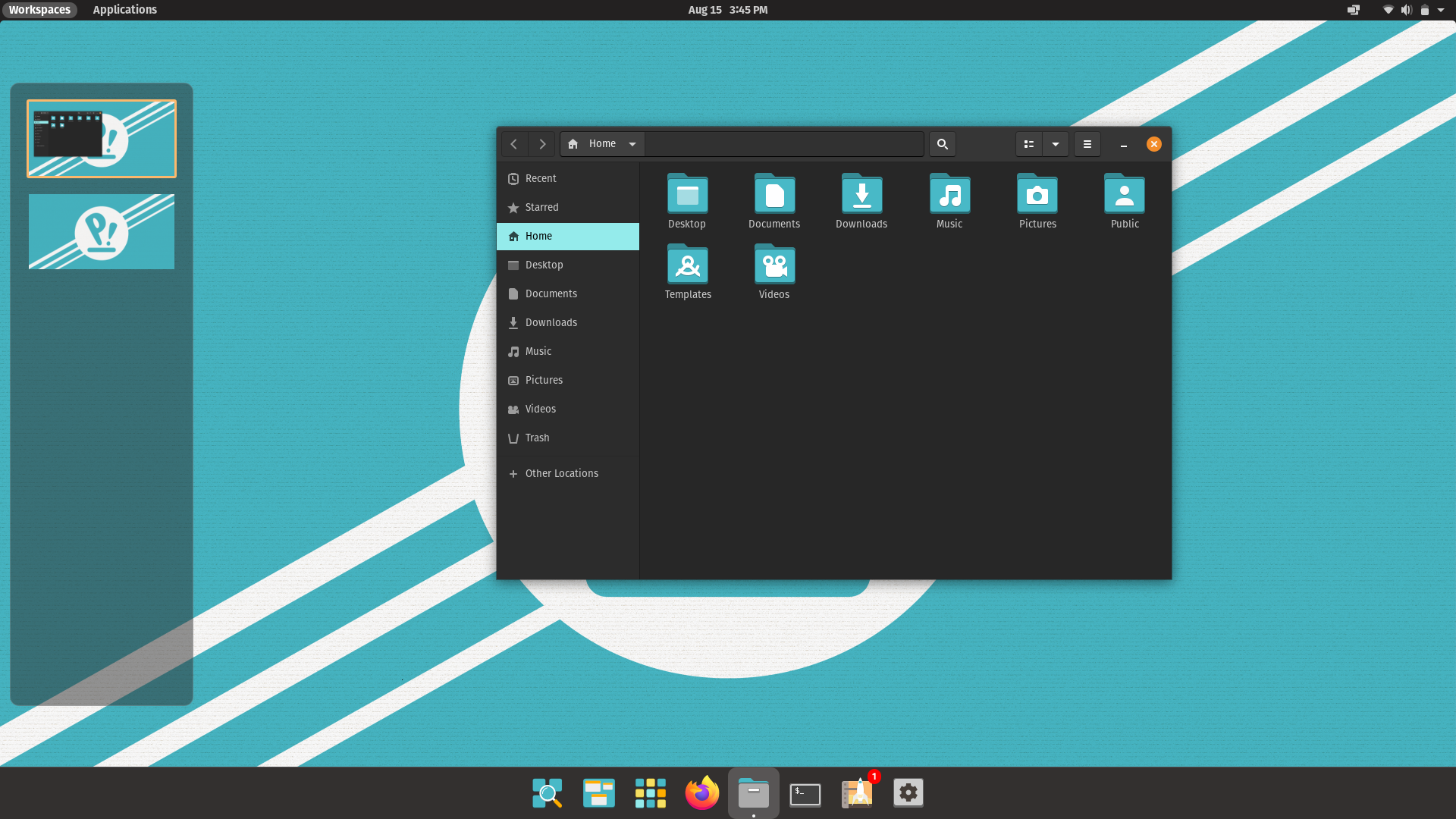
Pop!_OS 21.04

Pop!_OS is a Linux distribution developed by System76 based on Ubuntu. It is intended for use by "developers, makers, and computer science professionals." Pop!_OS provides full disk encryption by default as well as streamlined window management, workspaces, and keyboard shortcuts for navigation. Pop!_OS comes preinstalled on System76 devices, and can also be downloaded and installed on most computers.

=== COSMIC desktop environment ===
COSMIC is a desktop environment for Pop!_OS. Originally intended for the Pop!_OS distribution, it is now available as a standalone desktop environment.

== Community relations ==
The company has sponsored the Ubuntu Developer Summit, Southern California Linux Expo, and other Open Source/Linux events and conferences. Their official support forums are hosted by Canonical Ltd., the primary developer of Ubuntu.

System76 is an active member in the Colorado Ubuntu Community, serving as the corporate sponsor for Ubuntu LoCo events and release parties in downtown Denver.

== See also ==
- Framework Computer
- Linux adoption
- Purism (company)
- Pine64
- Tuxedo Computers
