= Linux range of use =

Overview of Linux's uses

As of 2015, over four hundred Linux distributions are actively developed, with about a dozen distributions being most popular for general-purpose use.

Besides the Linux distributions designed for general-purpose use on desktops and servers, distributions may be specialized for different purposes including computer architecture support, embedded systems, stability, security, localization to a specific region or language, targeting of specific user groups, support for real-time applications, or commitment to a given desktop environment. Furthermore, some distributions deliberately include only free software.

== Desktop ==
Visible software components of the Linux desktop stack include the display server, widget engines, and some of the more widespread widget toolkits. There are also components not directly visible to end-users, including D-Bus and PulseAudio.

As of 2013, the popularity of Linux on standard desktop computers and laptops has been increasing over the years. Most modern distributions include a graphical user environment, with, as of February 2015, the three most popular environments being the KDE Plasma Desktop, Xfce and GNOME.

No single official Linux desktop exists: rather desktop environments and Linux distributions select components from a pool of free and open-source software with which they construct a GUI implementing some more or less strict design guide. GNOME, for example, has its human interface guidelines as a design guide, which gives the human–machine interface an important role, not just when doing the graphical design, but also when considering people with disabilities, and even when focusing on security.

The collaborative nature of free software development allows distributed teams to perform language localization of some Linux distributions for use in locales where localizing proprietary systems would not be cost-effective. For example, the Sinhalese language version of the Knoppix distribution became available significantly before Microsoft translated Windows XP into Sinhalese. In this case the Lanka Linux User Group played a major part in developing the localized system by combining the knowledge of university professors, linguists, and local developers.

=== Performance and applications ===
The performance of Linux on the desktop has been a controversial topic; for example in 2007 Con Kolivas accused the Linux community of favoring performance on servers. He quit Linux kernel development out of frustration with this lack of focus on the desktop, and then gave a "tell all" interview on the topic. Since then a significant amount of development has focused on improving the desktop experience. Projects such as systemd and Upstart (deprecated in 2014) aim for a faster boot time; the Wayland and Mir projects aim at replacing X11 while enhancing desktop performance, security and appearance. Userspace scheduler extensions make it possible to use a scheduler specialized for a specific usage, such as gaming or desktop usage.

Many popular applications are available for a wide variety of operating systems. For example, Mozilla Firefox, LibreOffice and Blender have downloadable versions for all major operating systems. Furthermore, some applications initially developed for Linux, such as Pidgin, and GIMP, were ported to other operating systems (including Windows and macOS) due to their popularity. In addition, a growing number of proprietary desktop applications are also supported on Linux, such as Autodesk Maya and The Foundry's Nuke in the high-end field of animation and visual effects; see the list of proprietary software for Linux for more details. There are also several companies that have ported their own or other companies' games to Linux, with Linux also being a supported platform on both the Steam and Desura digital-distribution services.

Many other types of applications available for Microsoft Windows and macOS also run on Linux. Commonly, either a free software application will exist which does the functions of an application found on another operating system, or that application will have a version that works on Linux, such as with Skype and some video games like Dota 2 and Team Fortress 2. Furthermore, the Wine project provides a Windows compatibility layer to run unmodified Windows applications on Linux. It is sponsored by commercial interests including CodeWeavers, which produces a commercial version of the software. Since 2009, Google has also provided funding to the Wine project. CrossOver, a proprietary solution based on the open-source Wine project, supports running Windows versions of Microsoft Office, Intuit applications such as Quicken and QuickBooks, Adobe Photoshop versions through CS2, and many games such as World of Warcraft. In other cases, where there is no Linux port of some software in areas such as desktop publishing and professional audio, there is equivalent software available on Linux. It is also possible to run applications written for Android on other versions of Linux using Waydroid.

=== Components and installation ===
Besides externally visible components, such as X window managers, a non-obvious but quite central role is played by the programs hosted by freedesktop.org, such as D-Bus or PulseAudio; both major desktop environments (GNOME and KDE) include them, each offering graphical front-ends written using the corresponding toolkit (GTK or Qt). A display server is another component, which for the longest time has been communicating in the X11 display server protocol with its clients; prominent software talking X11 includes the X.Org Server and Xlib. Frustration over the cumbersome X11 core protocol, and especially over its numerous extensions, has led to the creation of a new display server protocol, Wayland.

Installing, updating and removing software in Linux is typically done through the use of package managers such as the Synaptic Package Manager, PackageKit, and Yum Extender. While most major Linux distributions have extensive repositories, often containing tens of thousands of packages, not all the software that can run on Linux is available from the official repositories. Alternatively, users can install packages from unofficial repositories, download pre-compiled packages directly from websites, or compile the source code by themselves. All these methods come with different degrees of difficulty; compiling the source code is in general considered a challenging process for new Linux users, but it is hardly needed in modern distributions and is not a method specific to Linux.

Samples of graphical desktop interfaces

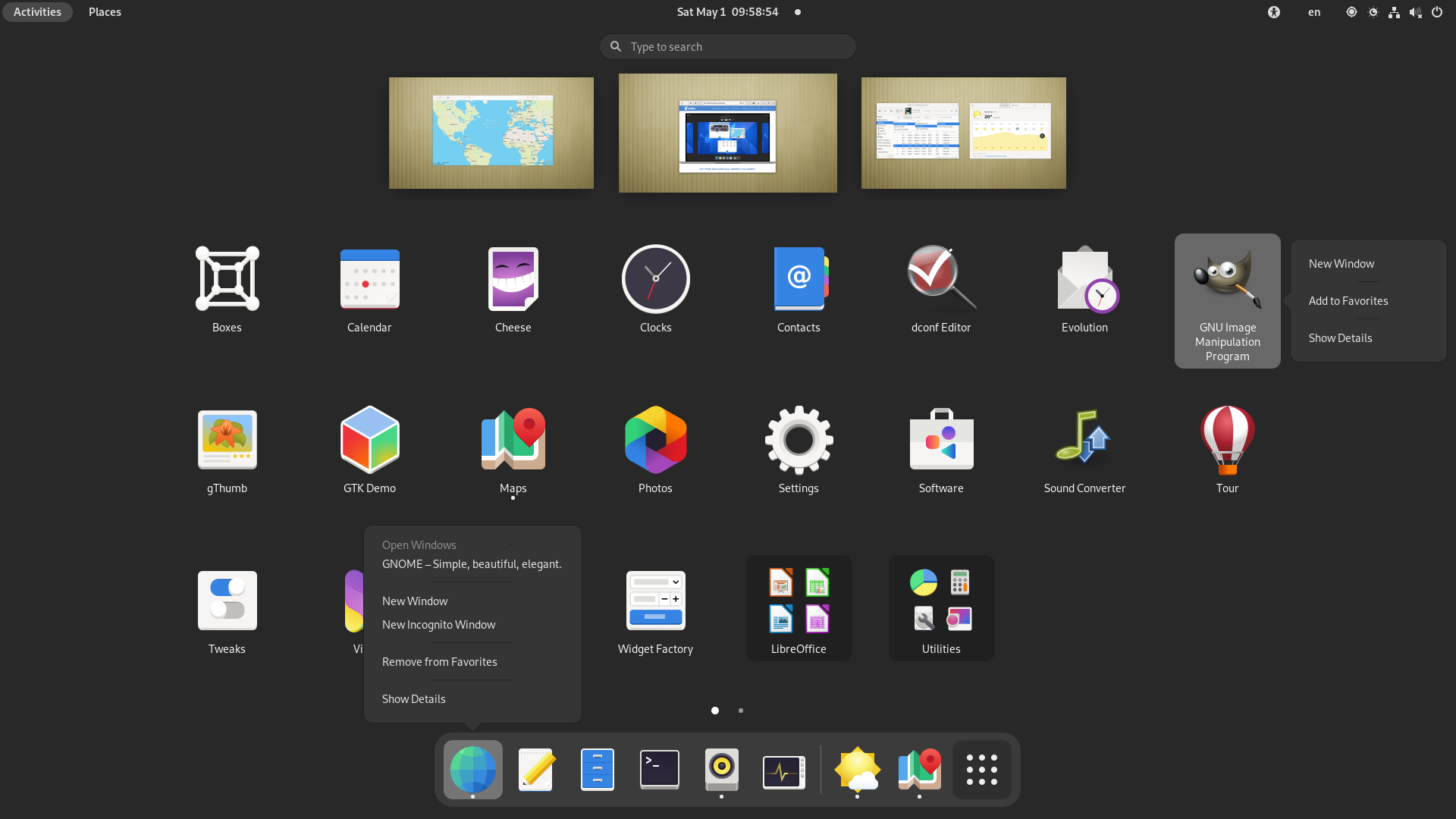
GNOME

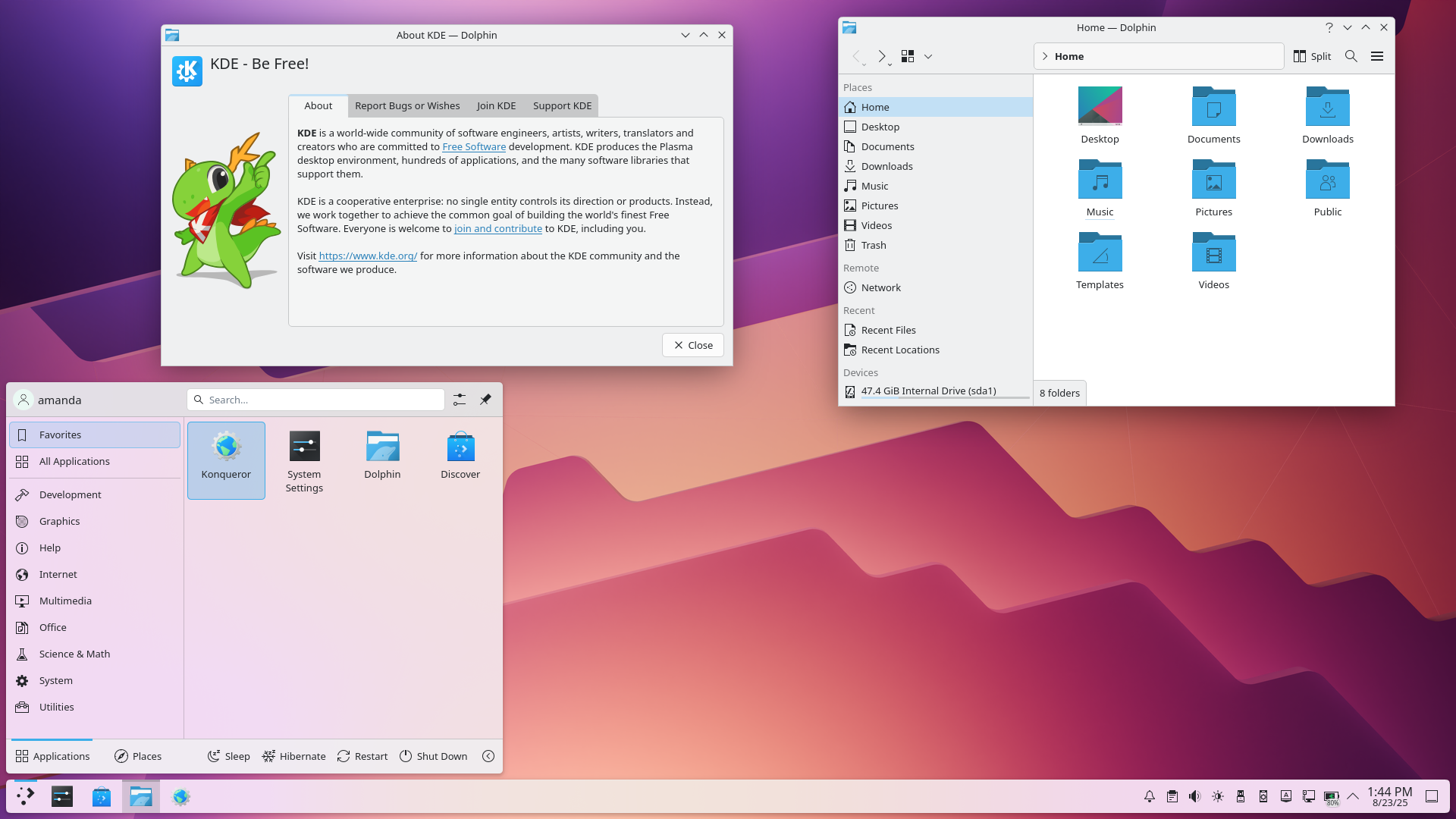
KDE Plasma 6

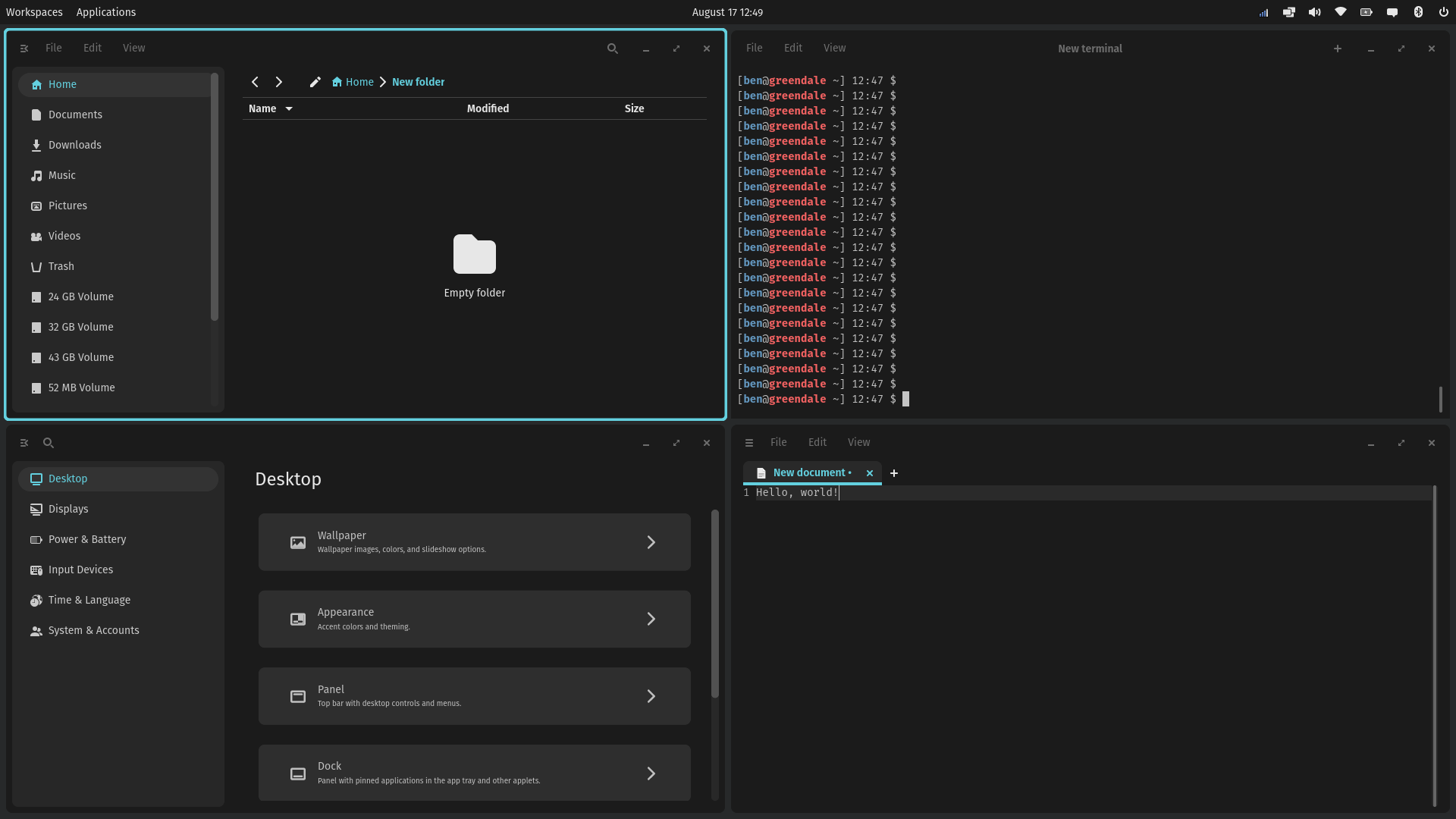
COSMIC

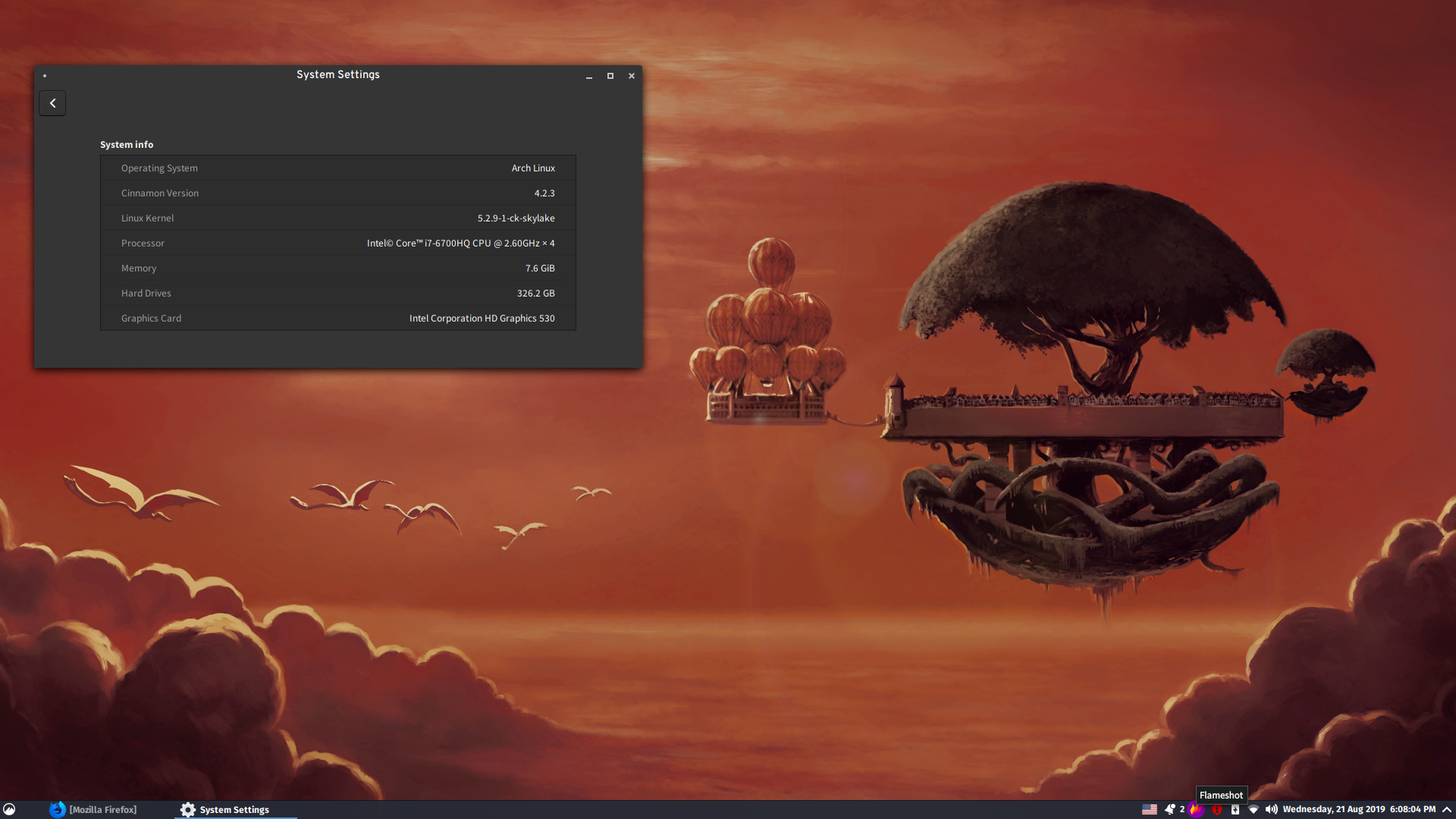
Cinnamon

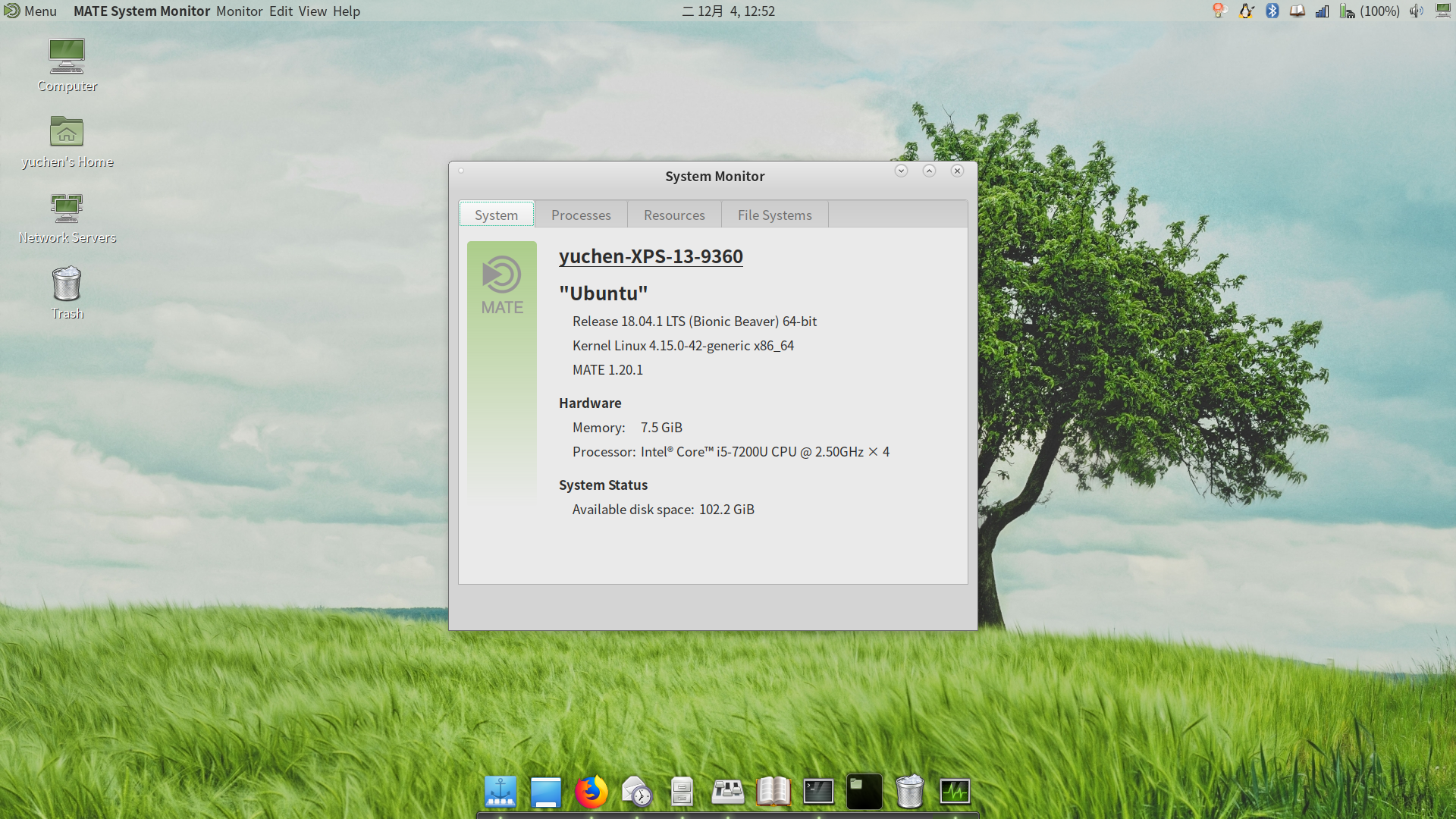
MATE (software)

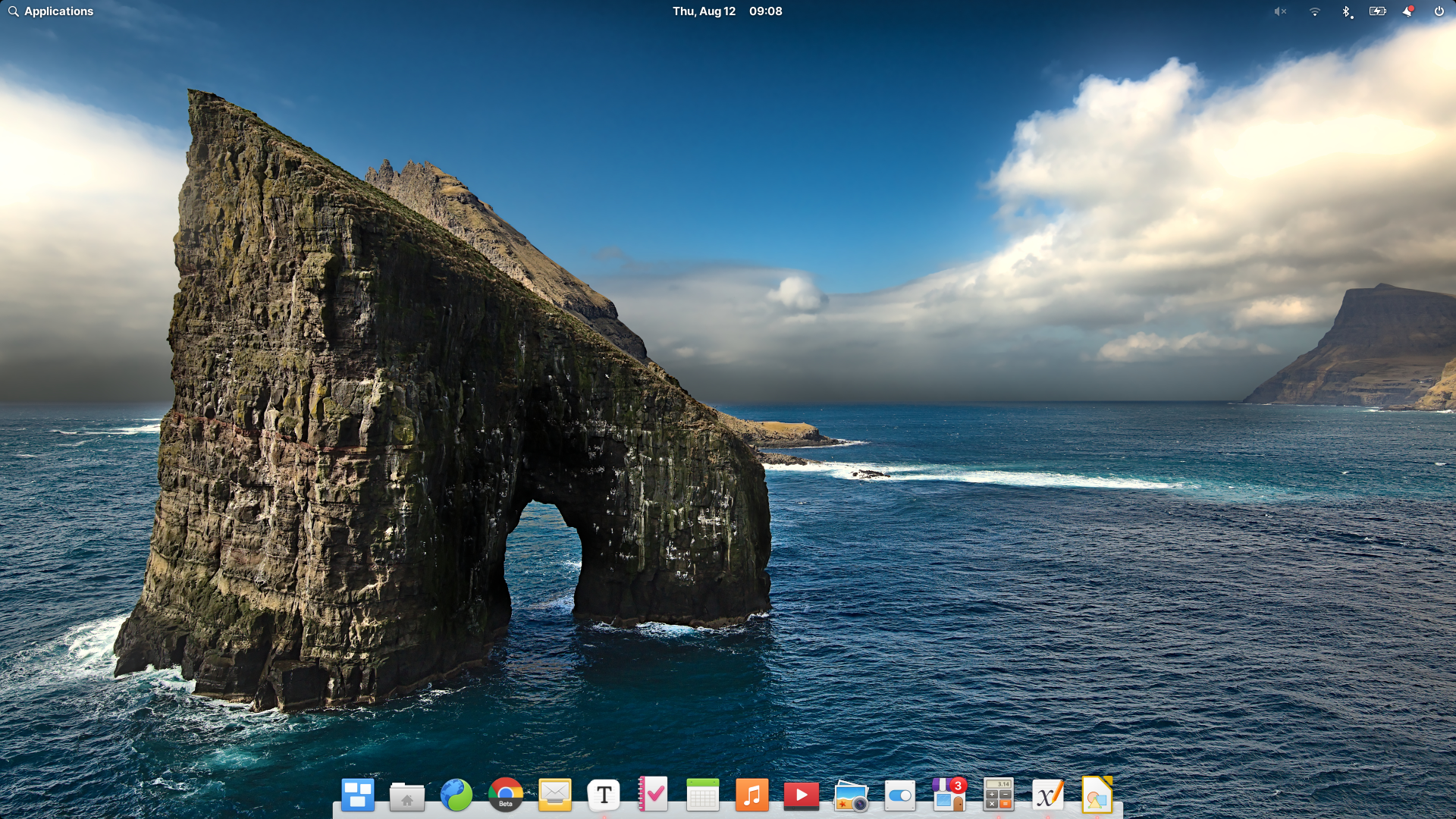
Pantheon

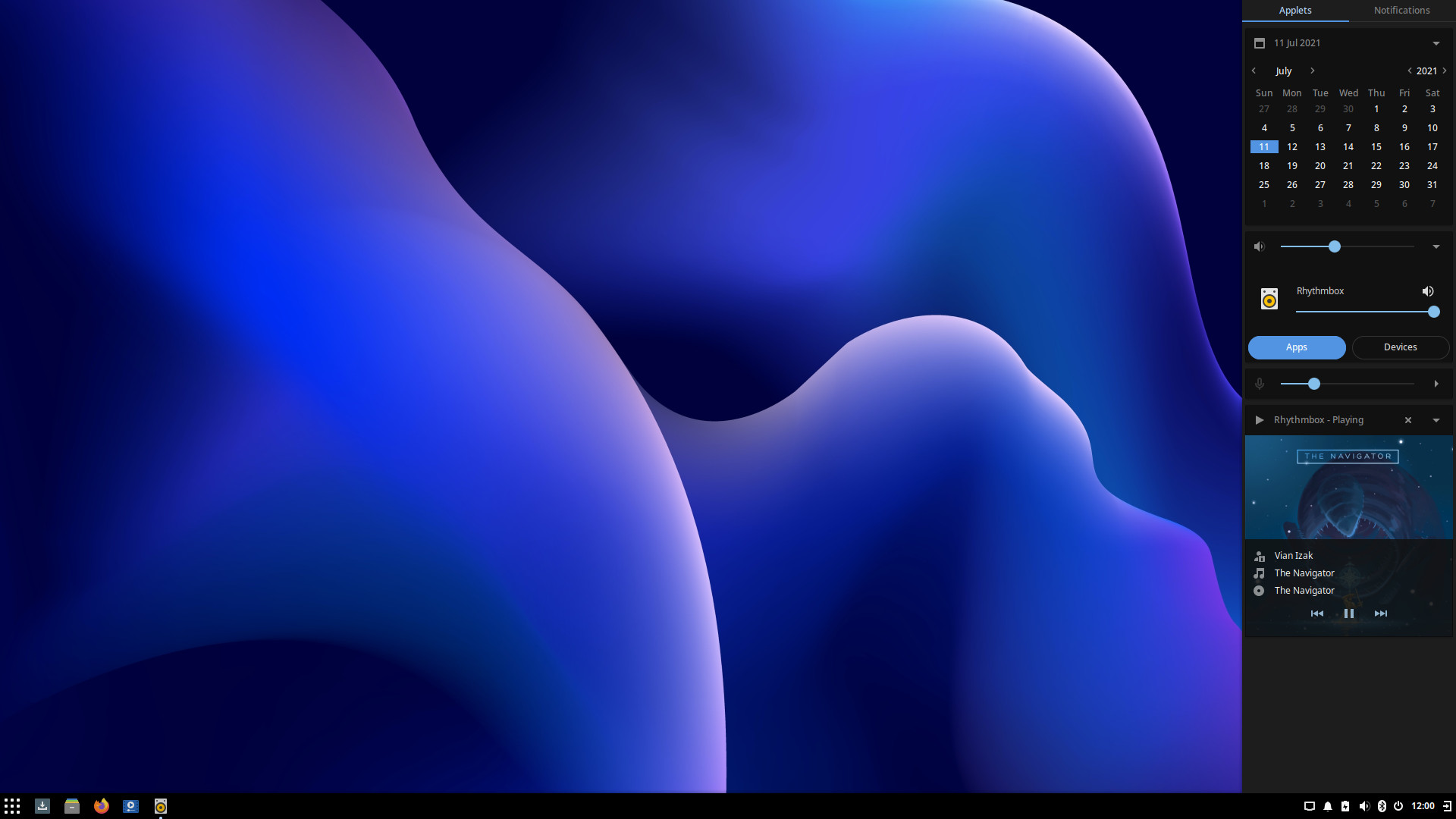
Budgie

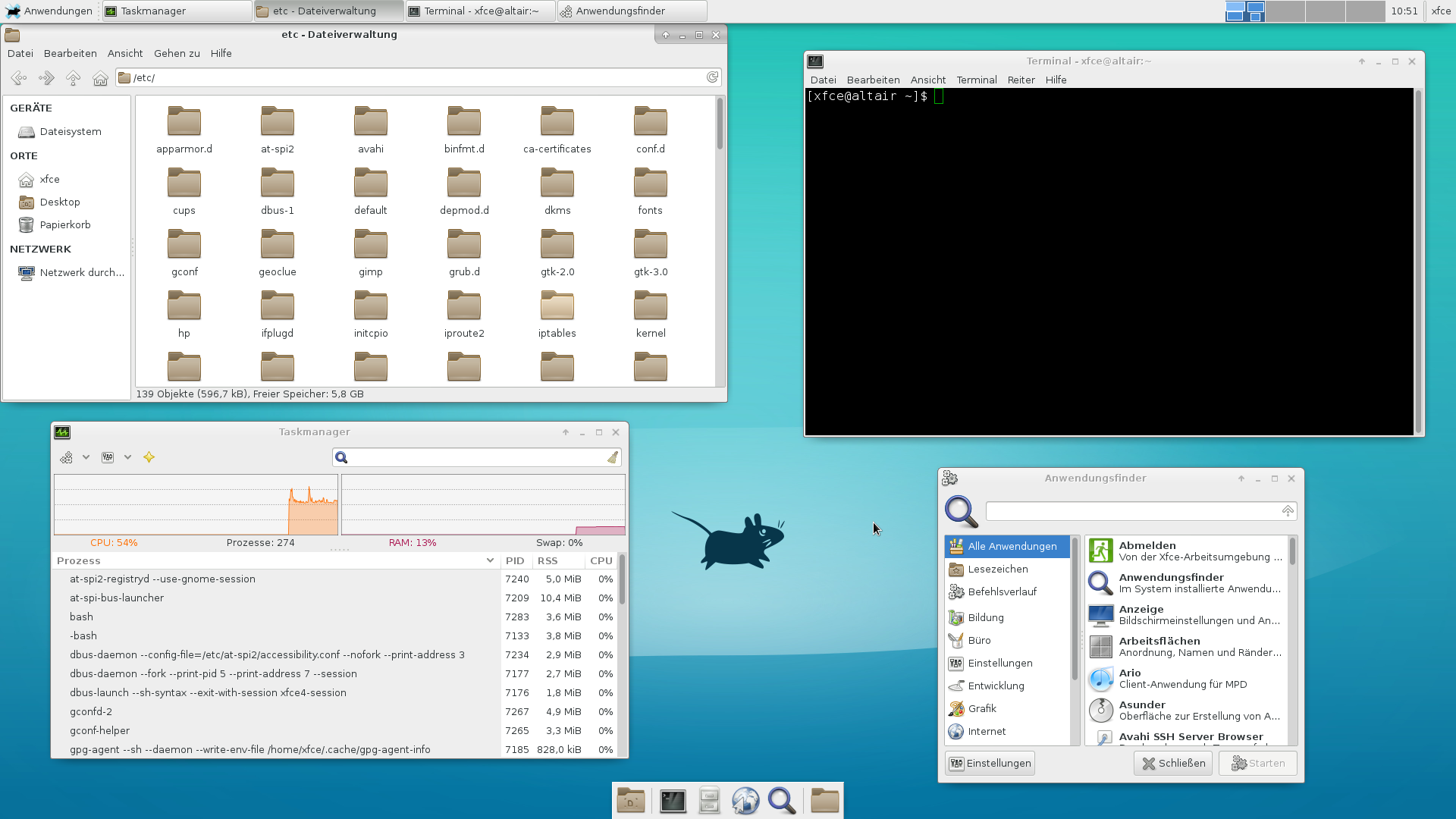
Xfce

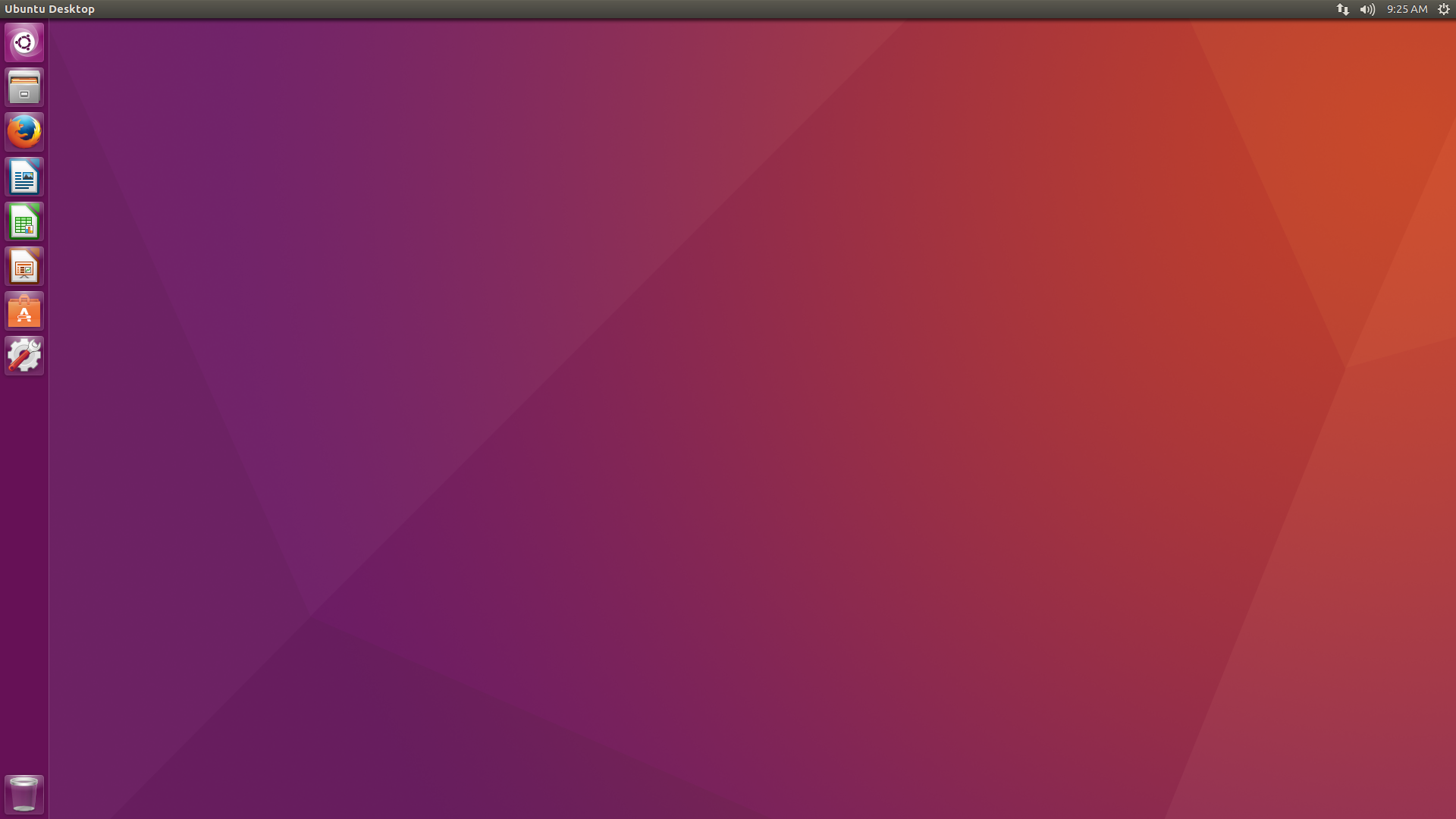
Unity

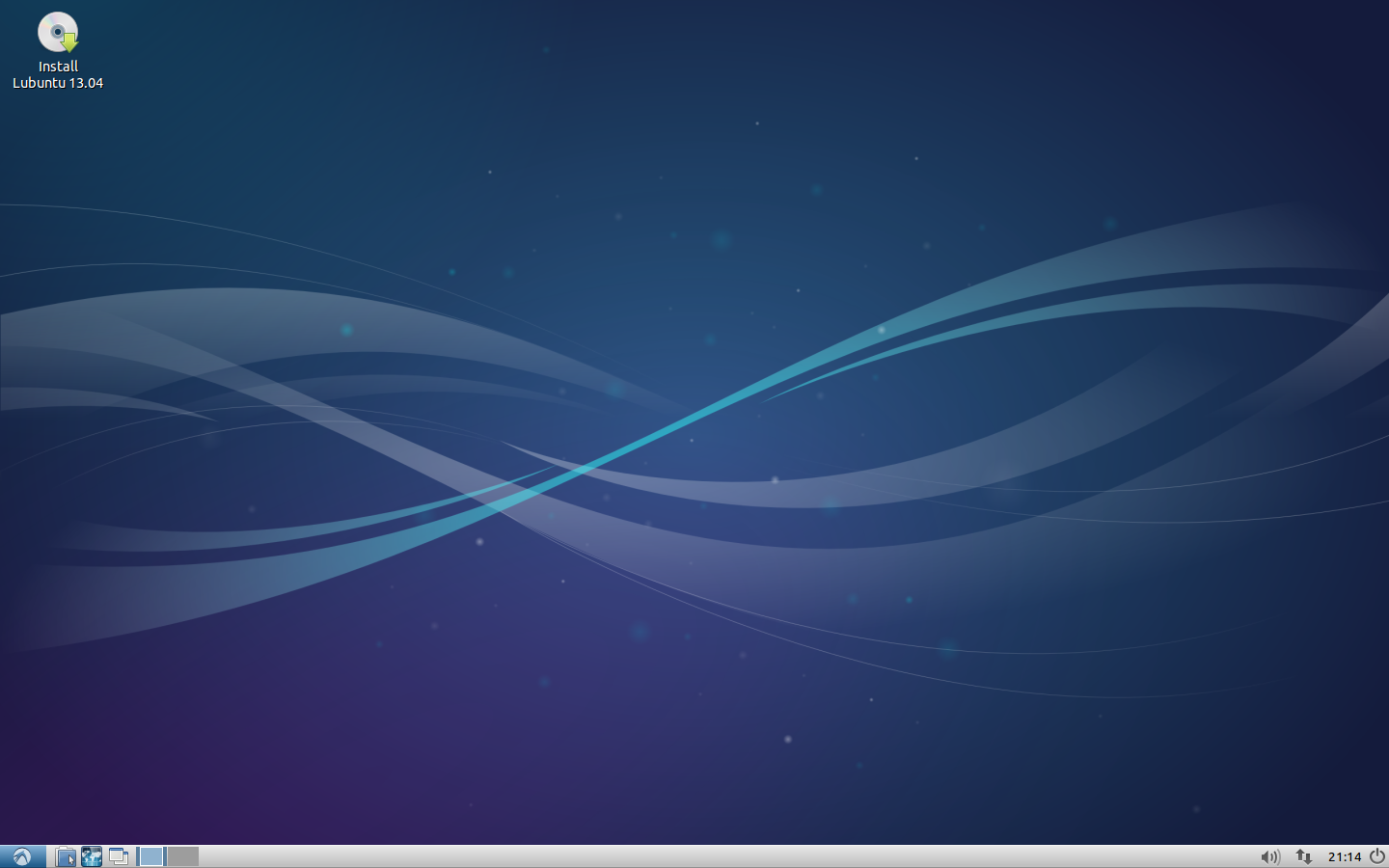
LXDE

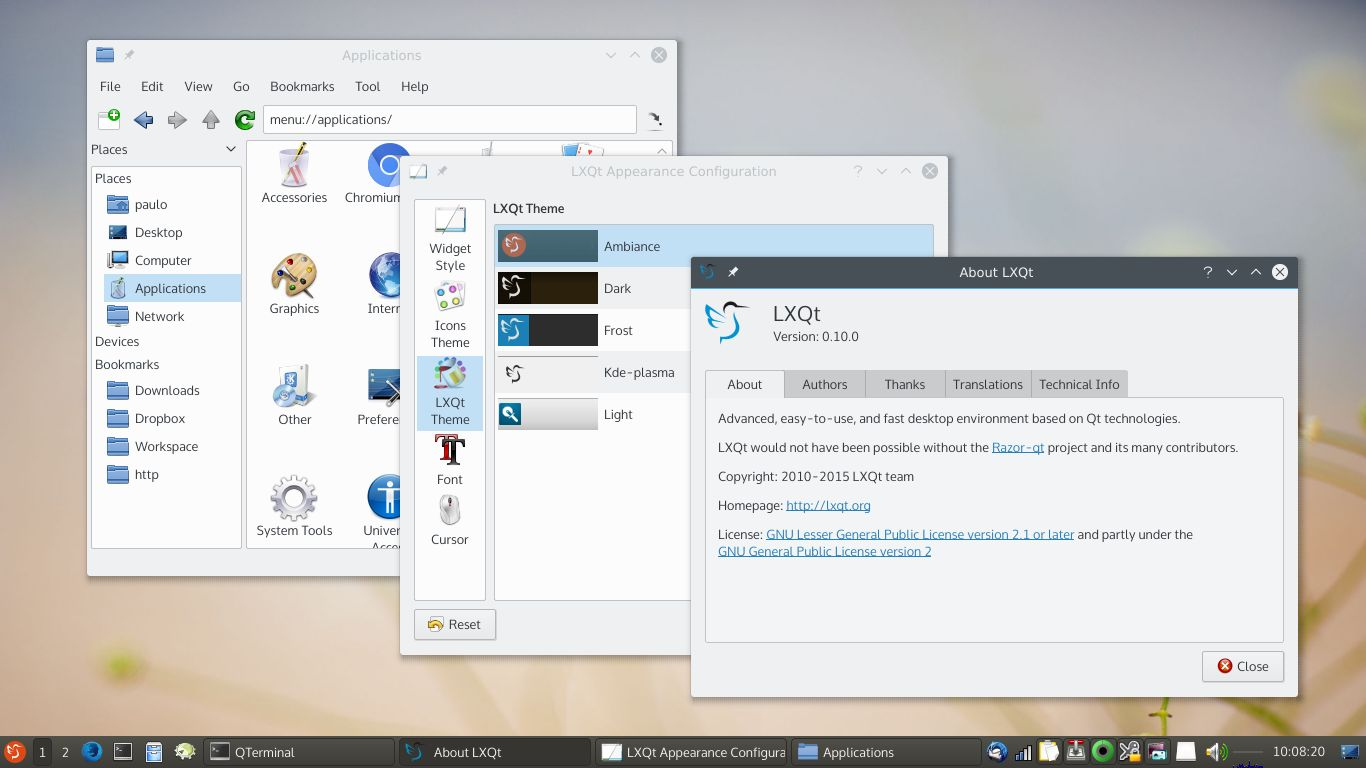
LXQt

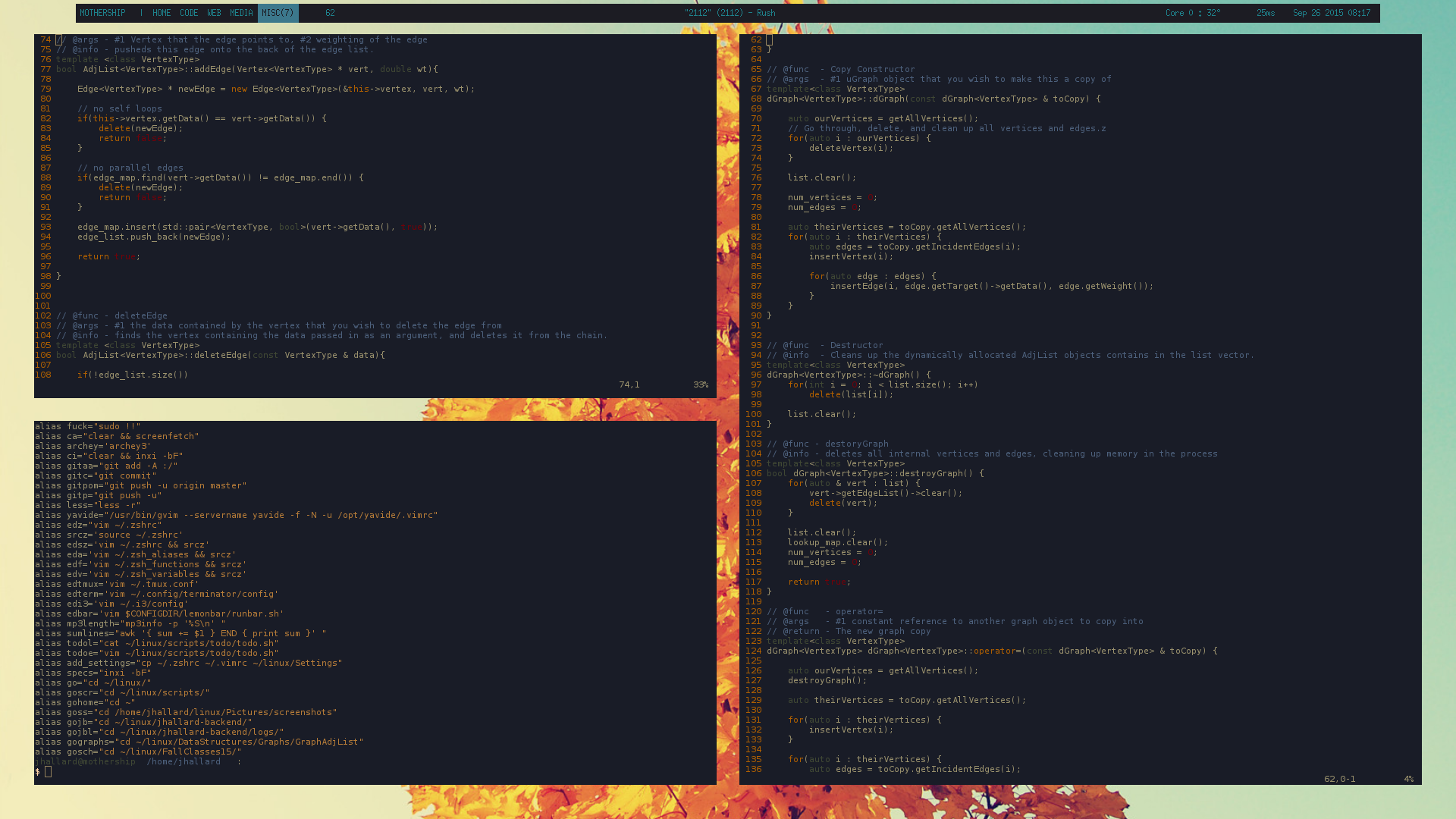
i3

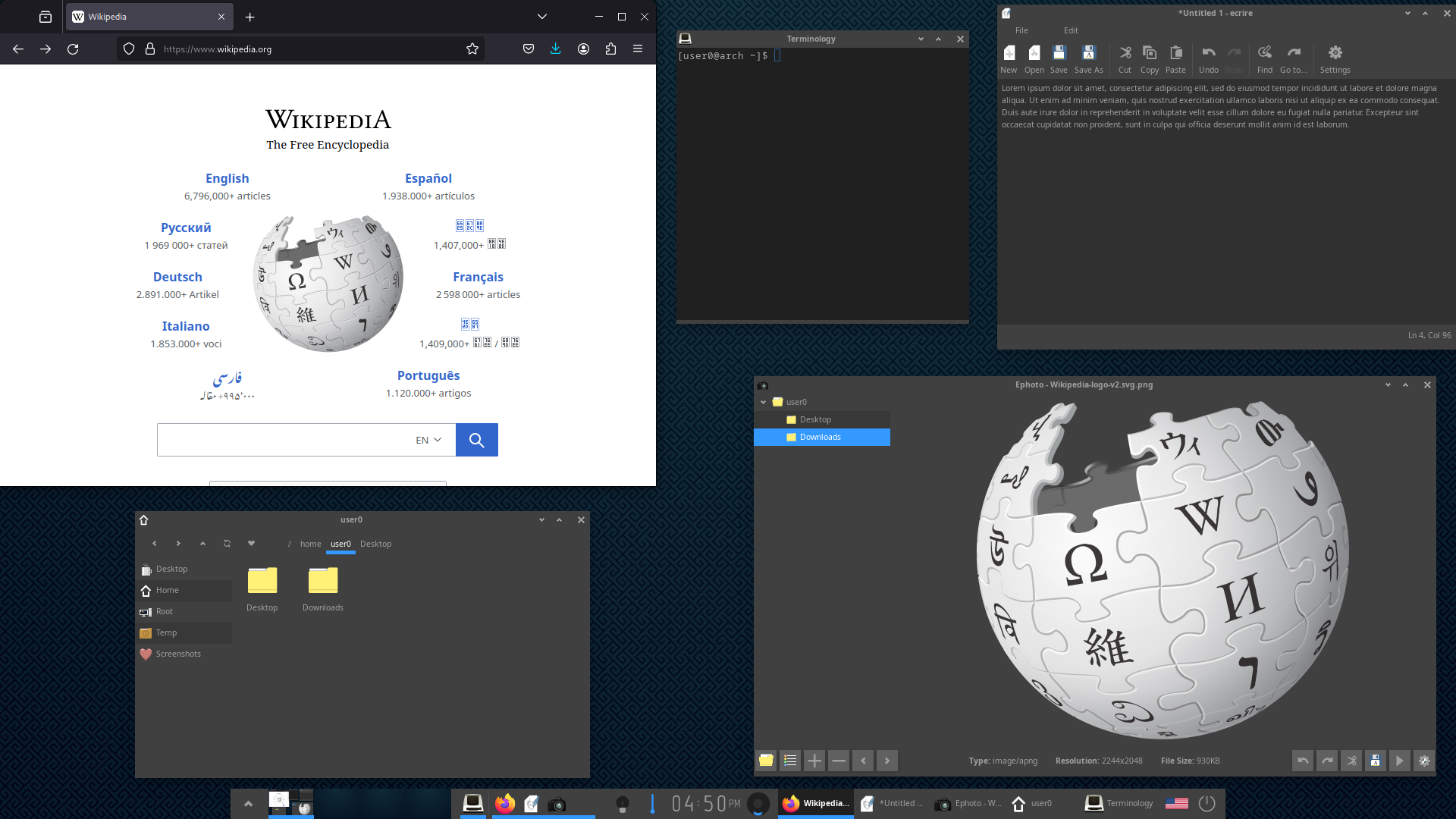
Enlightenment

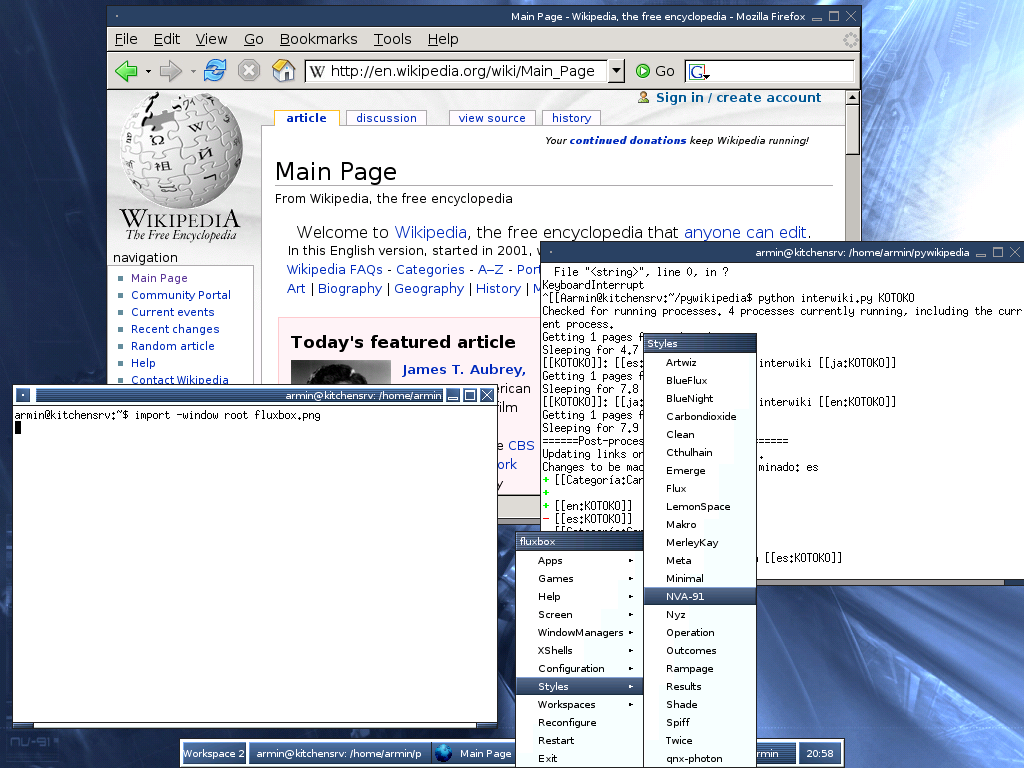
Fluxbox

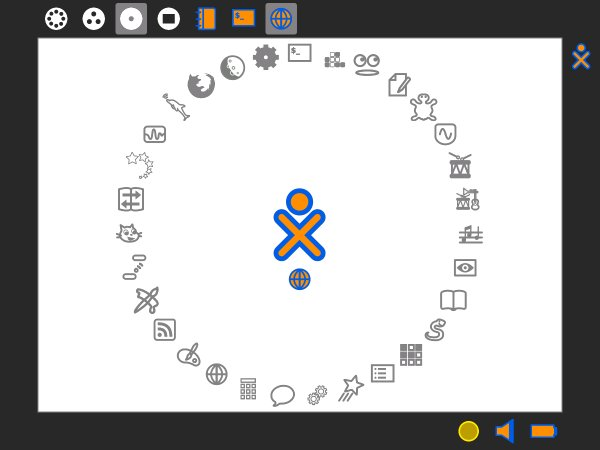
Sugar

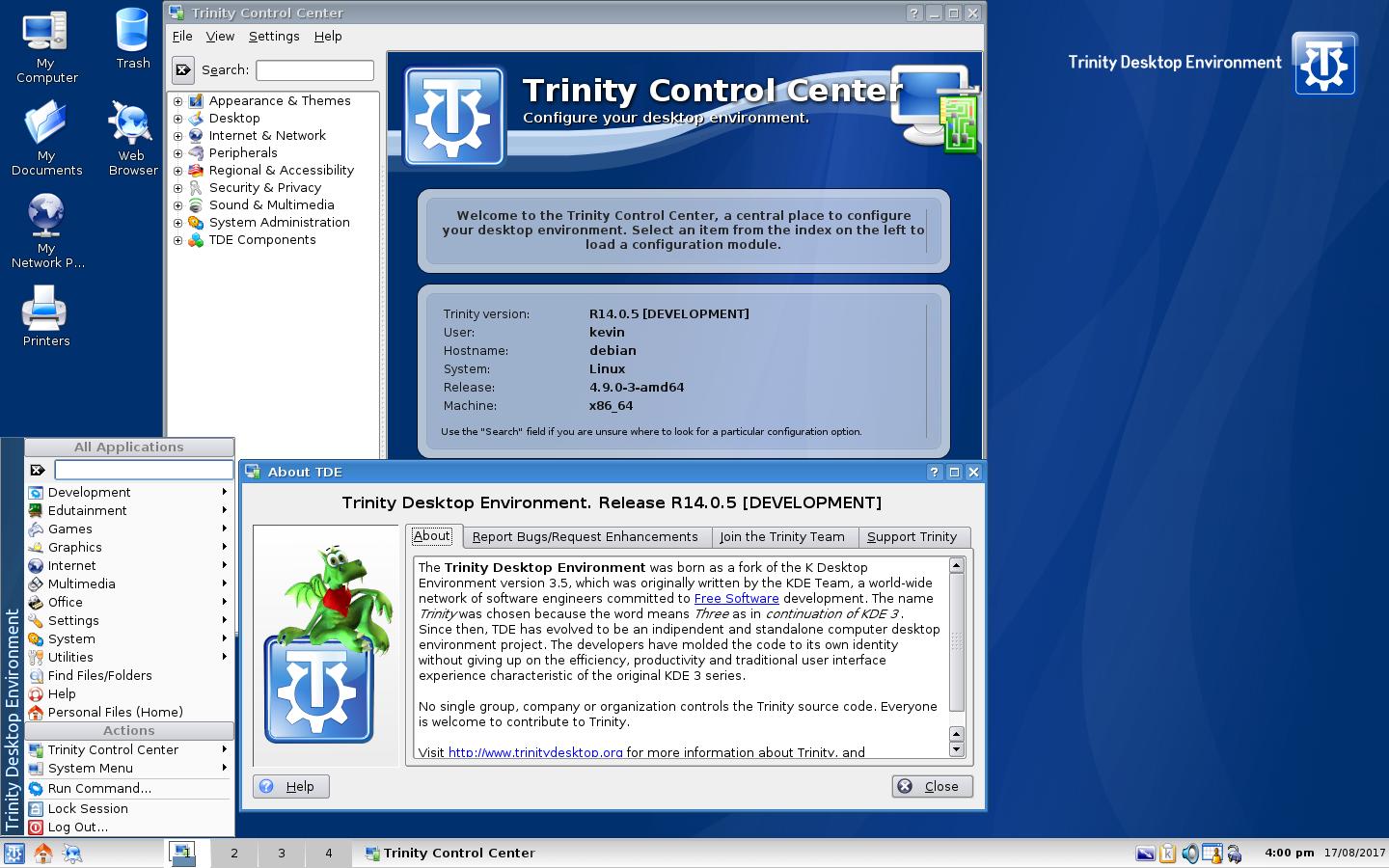
Trinity

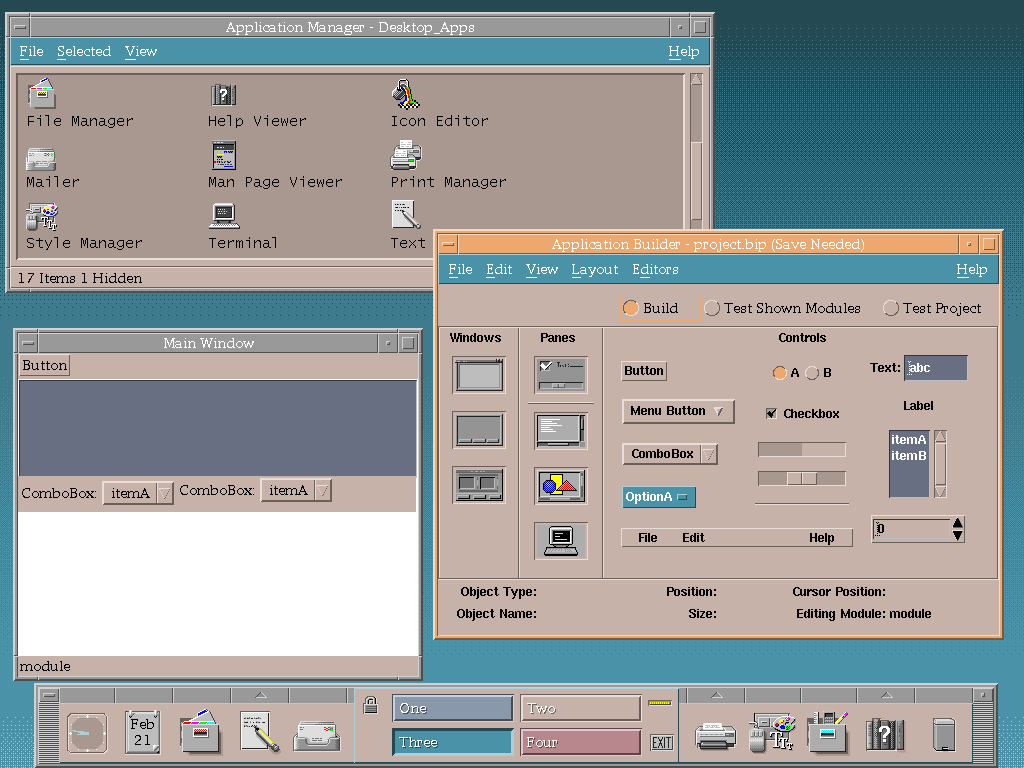
CDE

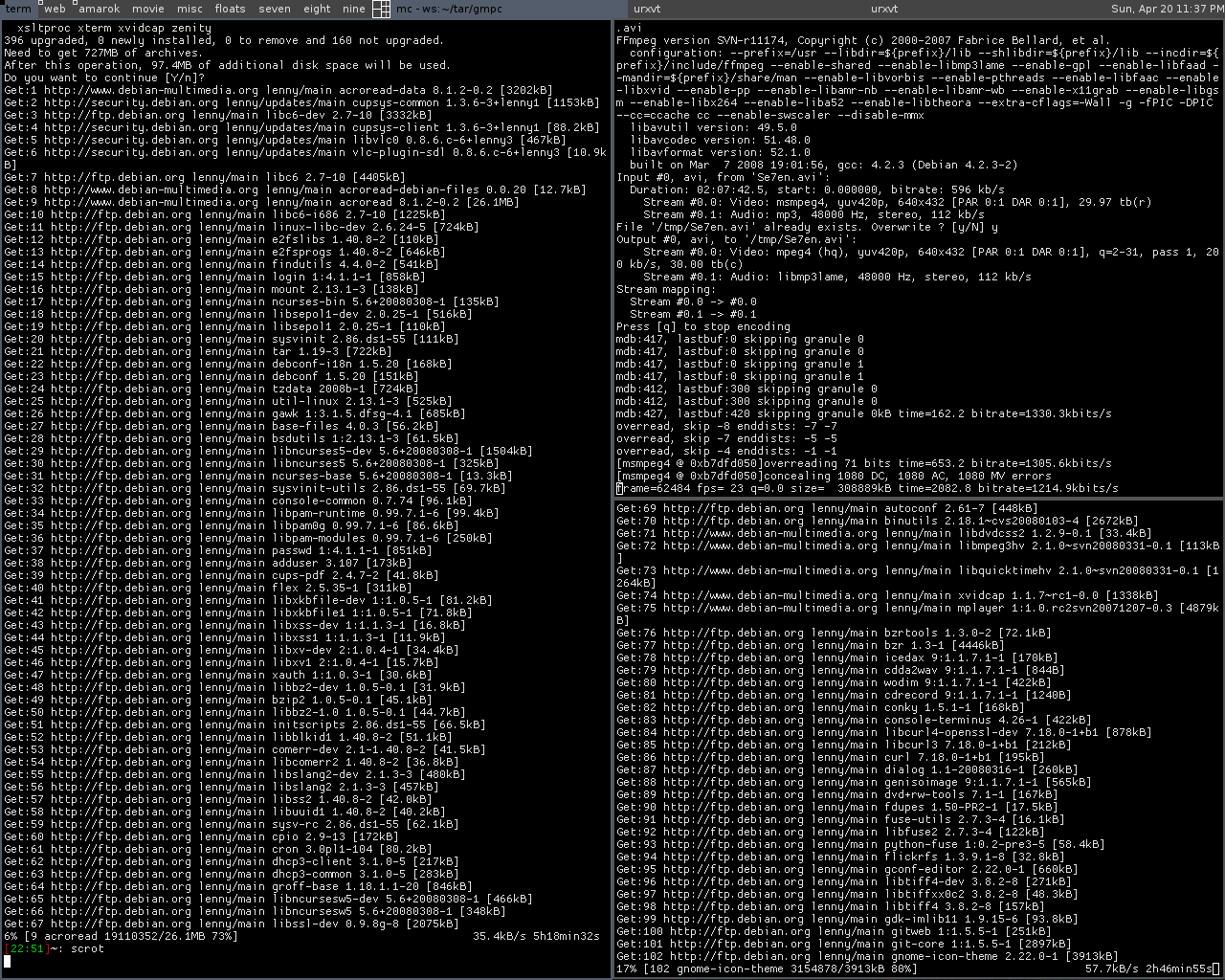
awesome

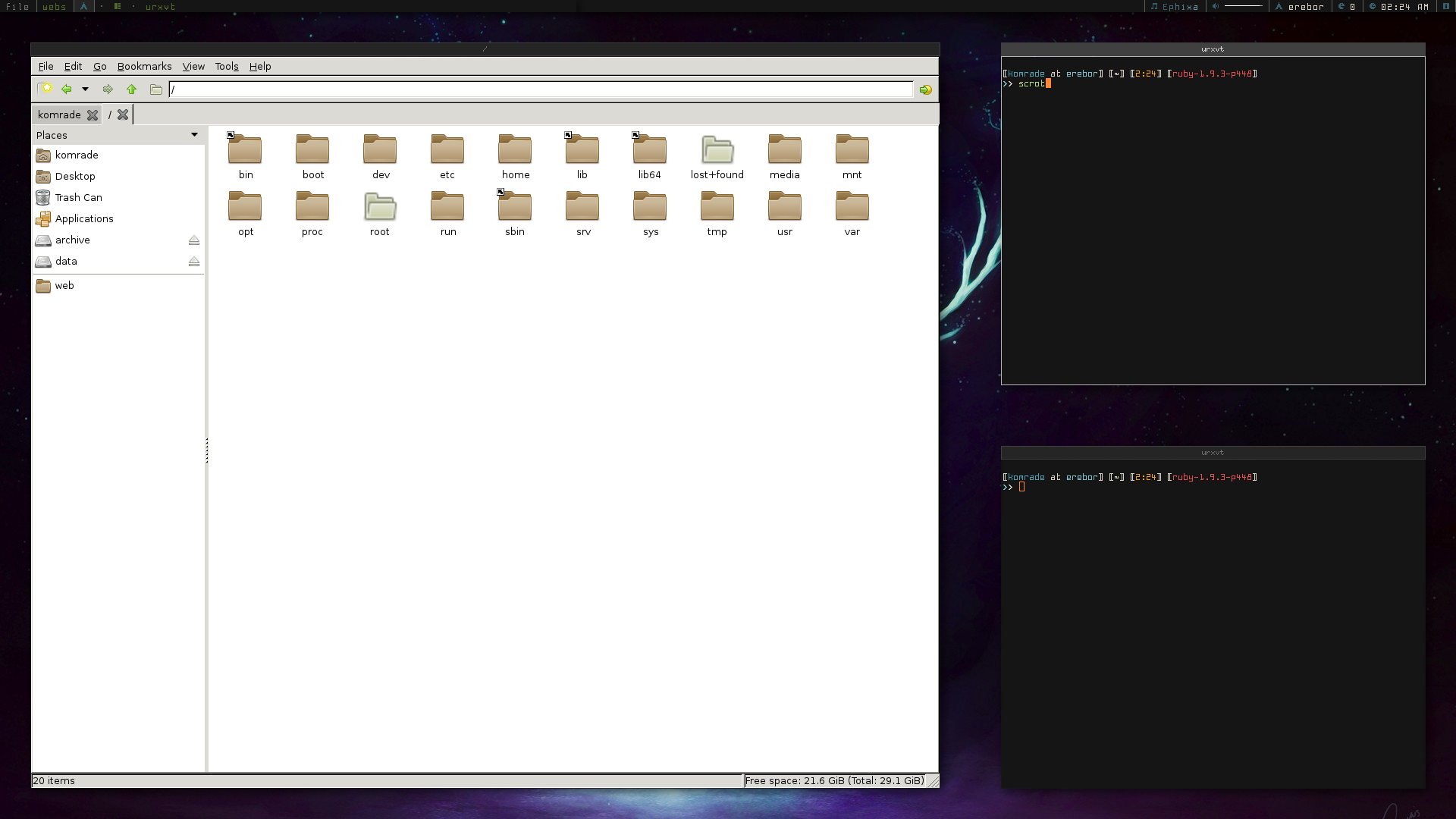
xmonad

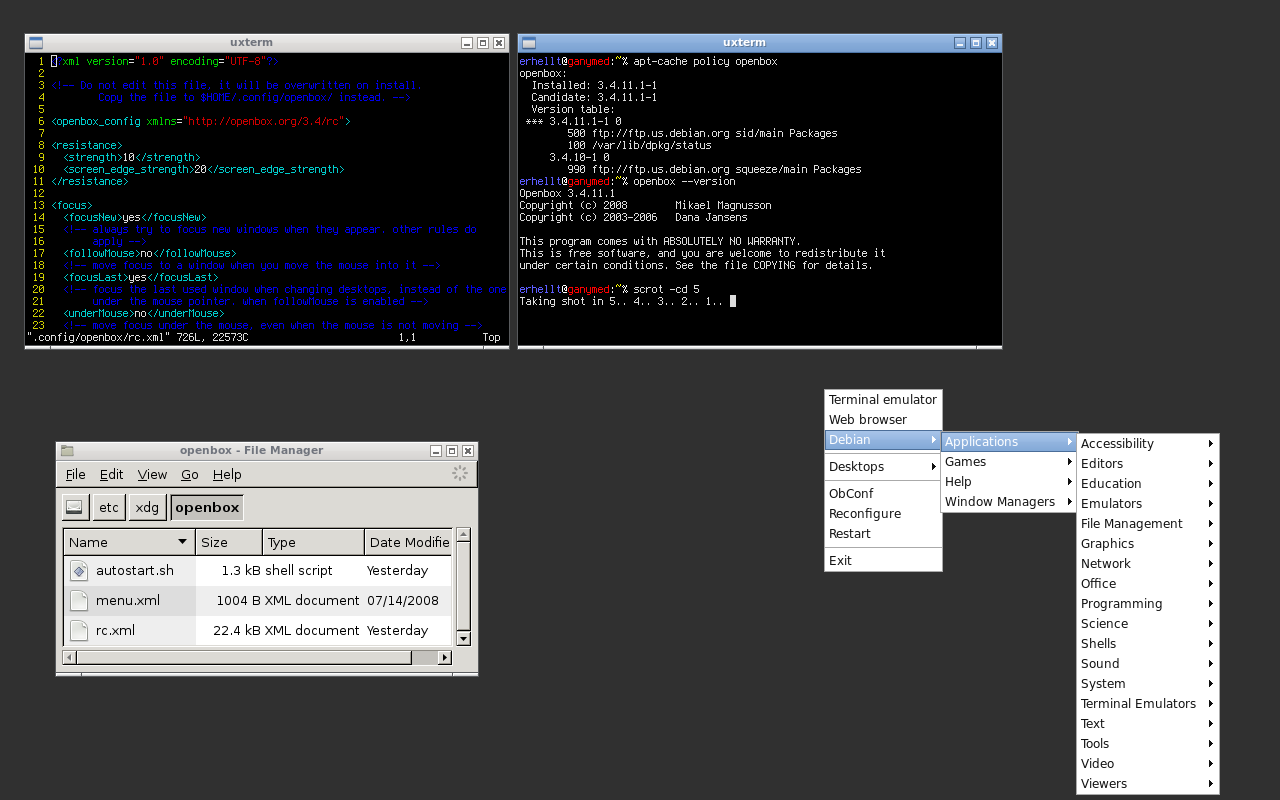
Openbox

== Netbooks ==
Linux distributions have also become popular in the netbook market, with many devices such as the Asus Eee PC and Acer Aspire One shipping with customized Linux distributions installed.

In 2009, Google announced its ChromeOS as a minimal Linux-based operating system, using the Chrome browser as the main user interface. ChromeOS initially did not run any non-web applications, except for the bundled file manager and media player. Netbooks that shipped with the operating system, termed Chromebooks, started appearing on the market in June 2011.

By 2015 Chromebooks with large screens were available, and also in other forms factors such as laptop, desktop, tablet and all-in-one. Android applications support was added. As of 2018, Google added the ability to install any Linux software in a container, enabling ChromeOS to be used like any other Linux distribution.

== Servers, mainframes and supercomputers ==
Broad overview of the LAMP software bundle, displayed here together with Squid. A high-performance and high-availability web server solution providing security in a hostile environment.

Linux distributions have long been used as server operating systems, and have risen to prominence in that area; Netcraft reported in September 2006, that eight of the ten (other two with "unknown" OS) most reliable internet hosting companies ran Linux distributions on their web servers, with Linux in the top position. In June 2008, Linux distributions represented five of the top ten, FreeBSD three of ten, and Microsoft two of ten; since February 2010, Linux distributions represented six of the top ten, FreeBSD three of ten, and Microsoft one of ten, with Linux in the top position.

Linux distributions are the cornerstone of the LAMP server-software combination (Linux, Apache, MariaDB/MySQL, Perl/PHP/Python) which is one of the more common platforms for website hosting.

Linux distributions have become increasingly common on mainframes, partly due to pricing and the open-source model. In December 2009, computer giant IBM reported that it would predominantly market and sell mainframe-based Enterprise Linux Server. At LinuxCon North America 2015, IBM announced LinuxONE, a series of mainframes specifically designed to run Linux and open-source software.

Linux distributions are also dominant as operating systems for supercomputers. As of November 2017, all supercomputers on the 500 list run some variant of Linux.

== Smart devices ==
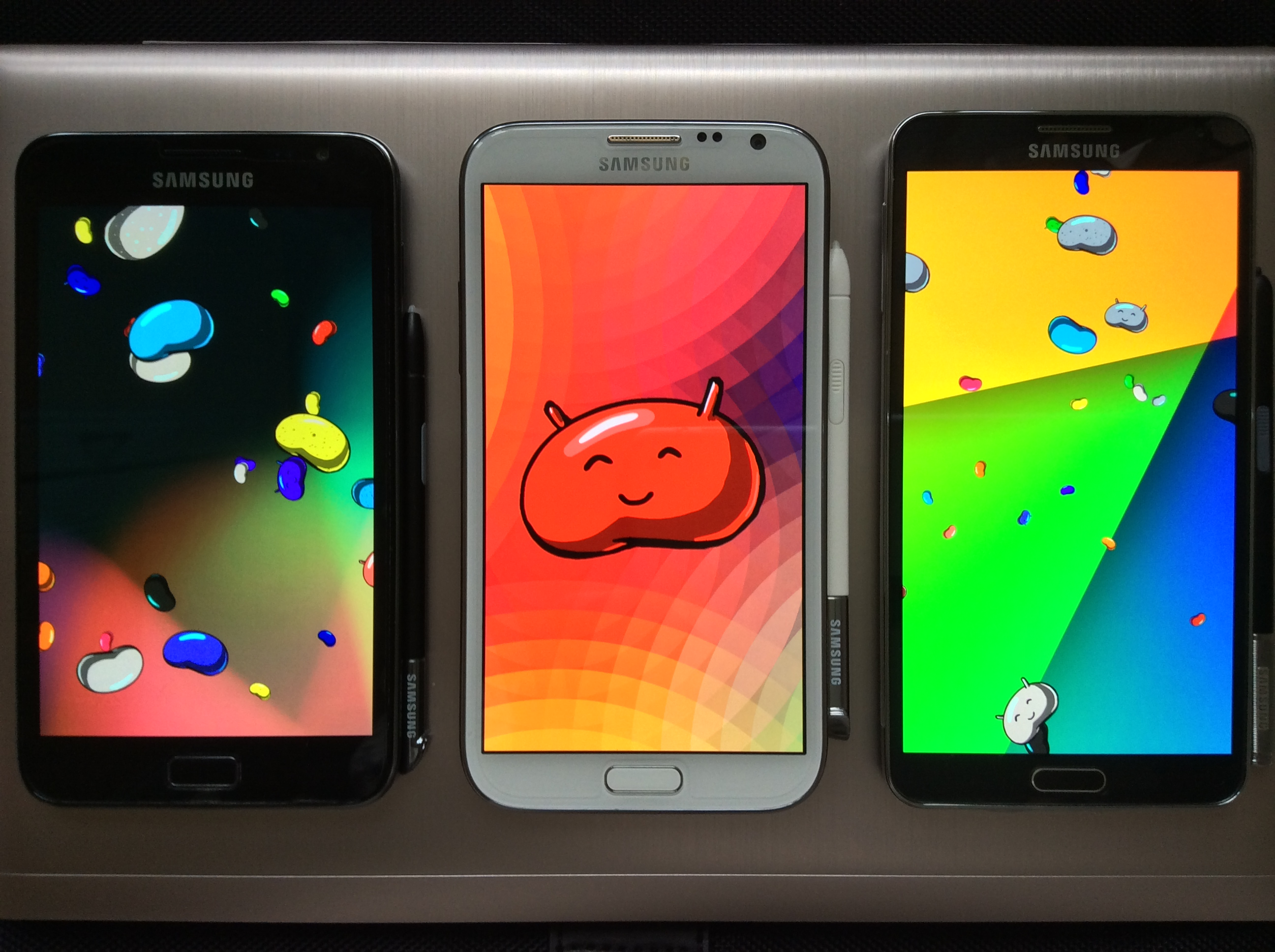
Android smartphones

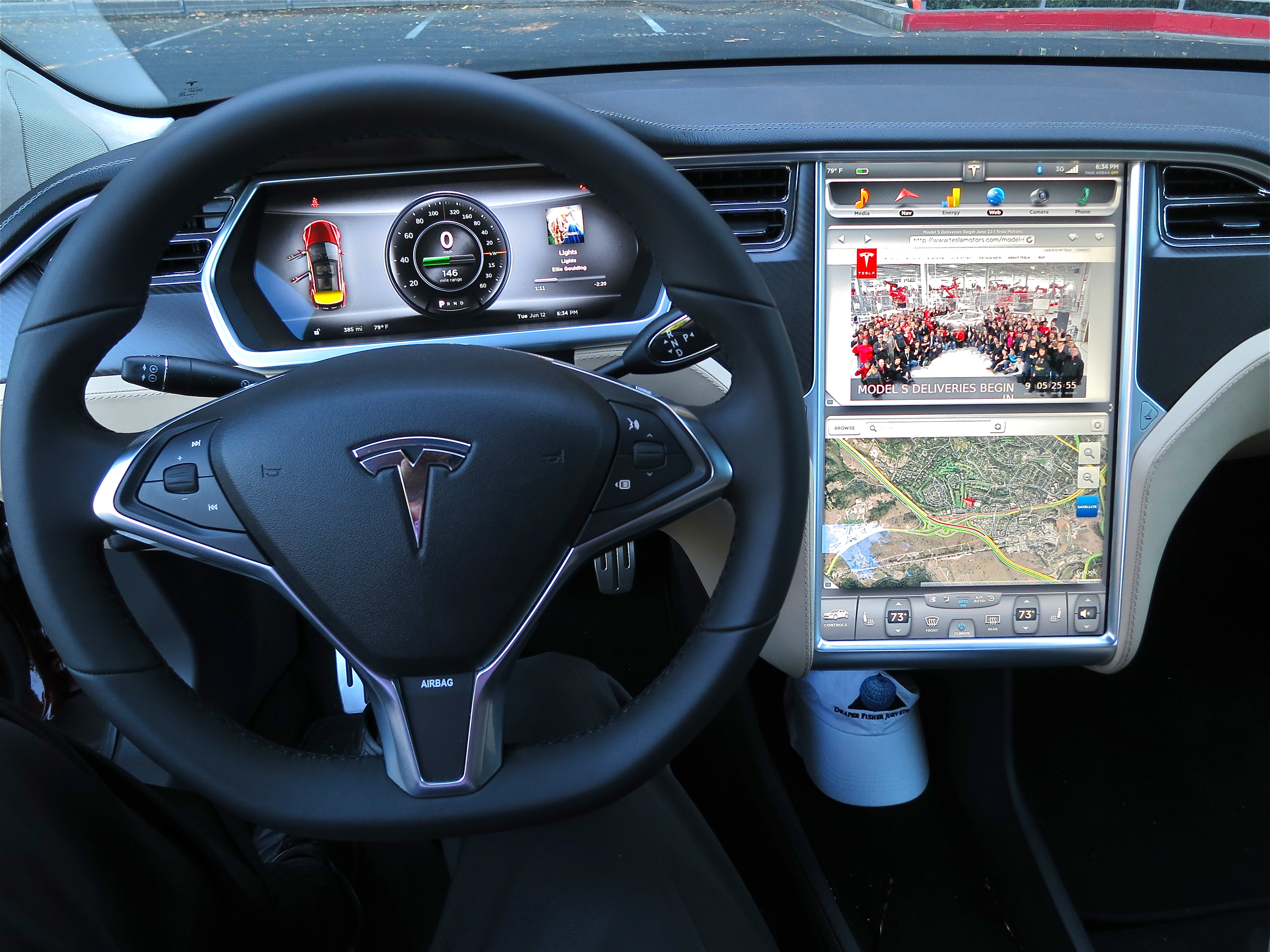
In-car entertainment system of the Tesla Model S is based on Ubuntu.

Several operating systems for smart devices, such as smartphones, tablet computers, home automation, smart TVs (Samsung and LG Smart TVs use Tizen and WebOS, respectively), and in-vehicle infotainment (IVI) systems (for example Automotive Grade Linux), are based on Linux. Major platforms for such systems include Android, Firefox OS, Mer and Tizen.

Based on web use, Android's usage share of operating systems dominates globally, with almost double the marketshare of Microsoft Windows. As of September 2024 it has 45.4% of the global market, followed by Windows with less than 25.6%.

Although Android is based on a modified version of the Linux kernel, commentators disagree on whether the term "Linux distribution" applies to it, and whether it is "Linux" according to the common usage of the term. Android is a Linux distribution according to the Linux Foundation, Google's open-source chief Chris DiBona, and several journalists. Others, such as Google engineer Patrick Brady, say that Android is not Linux in the traditional Unix-like Linux distribution sense; Android does not include the GNU C Library (it uses Bionic as an alternative C library) and some other components typically found in Linux distributions. Ars Technica wrote that "Although Android is built on top of the Linux kernel, the platform has very little in common with the conventional desktop Linux stack".

Cellphones and PDAs running Linux on open-source platforms became more common from 2007; examples include the Nokia N810, Openmoko's Neo1973, and the Motorola ROKR E8. Continuing the trend, Palm (later acquired by HP) produced a new Linux-derived operating system, webOS, which is built into its line of Palm Pre smartphones.

Nokia's Maemo, one of the earliest mobile operating systems, was based on Debian. It was later merged with Intel's Moblin, another Linux-based operating system, to form MeeGo. The project was later terminated in favor of Tizen, an operating system targeted at mobile devices as well as IVI. Tizen is a project within The Linux Foundation. Several Samsung products are already running Tizen, Samsung Gear 2 being the most significant example. Samsung Z smartphones will use Tizen instead of Android.

As a result of MeeGo's termination, the Mer project forked the MeeGo codebase to create a basis for mobile-oriented operating systems. In July 2012, Jolla announced Sailfish OS, their own mobile operating system built upon Mer technology.

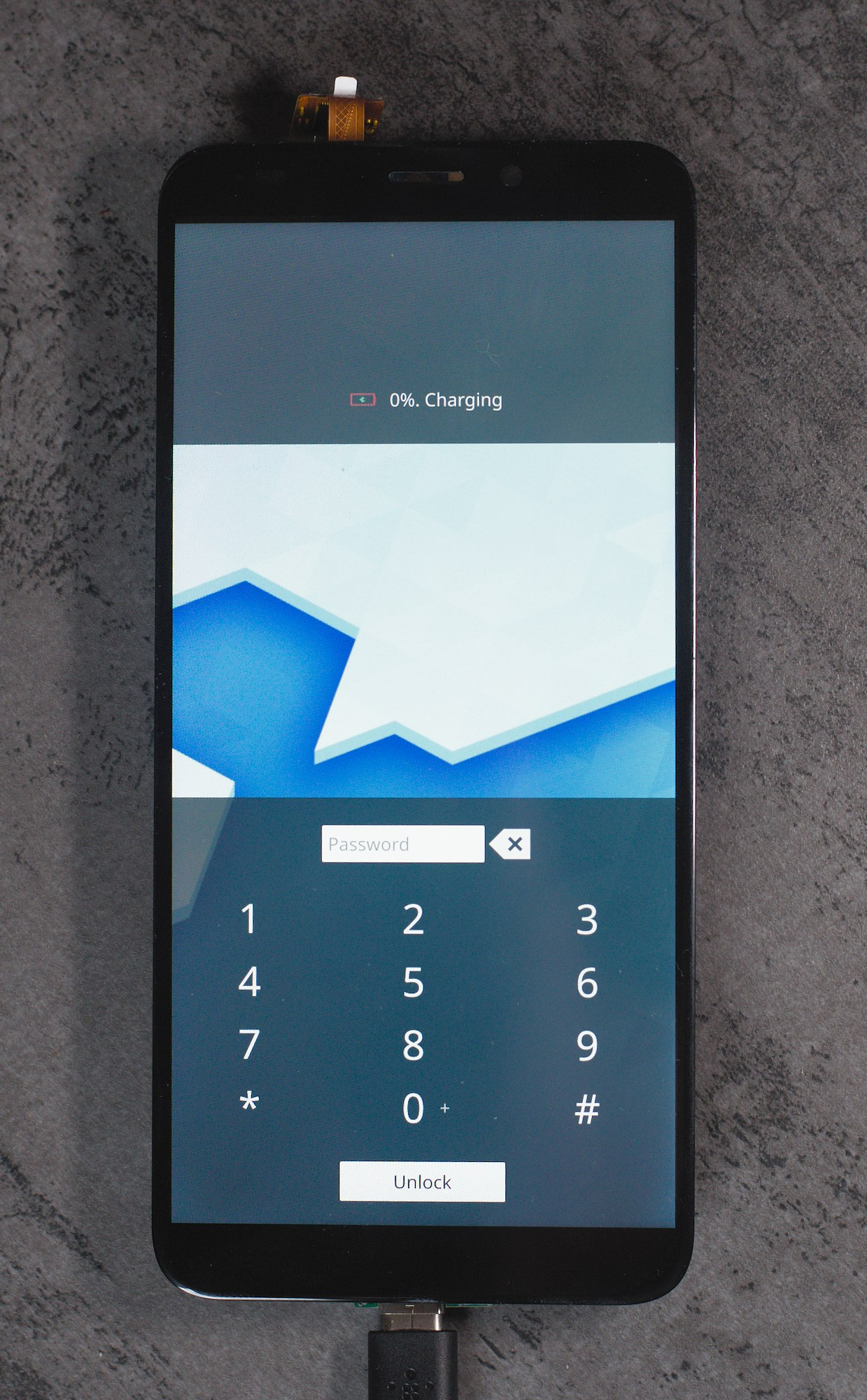
The PinePhone running Plasma Mobile on postmarketOS

Mozilla's Firefox OS consists of the Linux kernel, a hardware abstraction layer, a web-standards-based runtime environment and user interface, and an integrated web browser.

Canonical has released Ubuntu Touch, aiming to bring convergence to the user experience on this mobile operating system and its desktop counterpart, Ubuntu. The operating system also provides a full Ubuntu desktop when connected to an external monitor.

The Librem 5 is a smartphone developed by Purism. By default, it runs the company-made Linux-based PureOS, but it can also run other Linux distributions. Like Ubuntu Touch, PureOS is designed with convergence in mind, allowing desktop programs to run on the smartphone. An example of this is the desktop version of Mozilla Firefox.

Another smartphone is the PinePhone, made by the computer manufacturer Pine64. The PinePhone can run a variety of Linux-based operating systems such as Ubuntu Touch and postmarketOS.

== Embedded devices ==
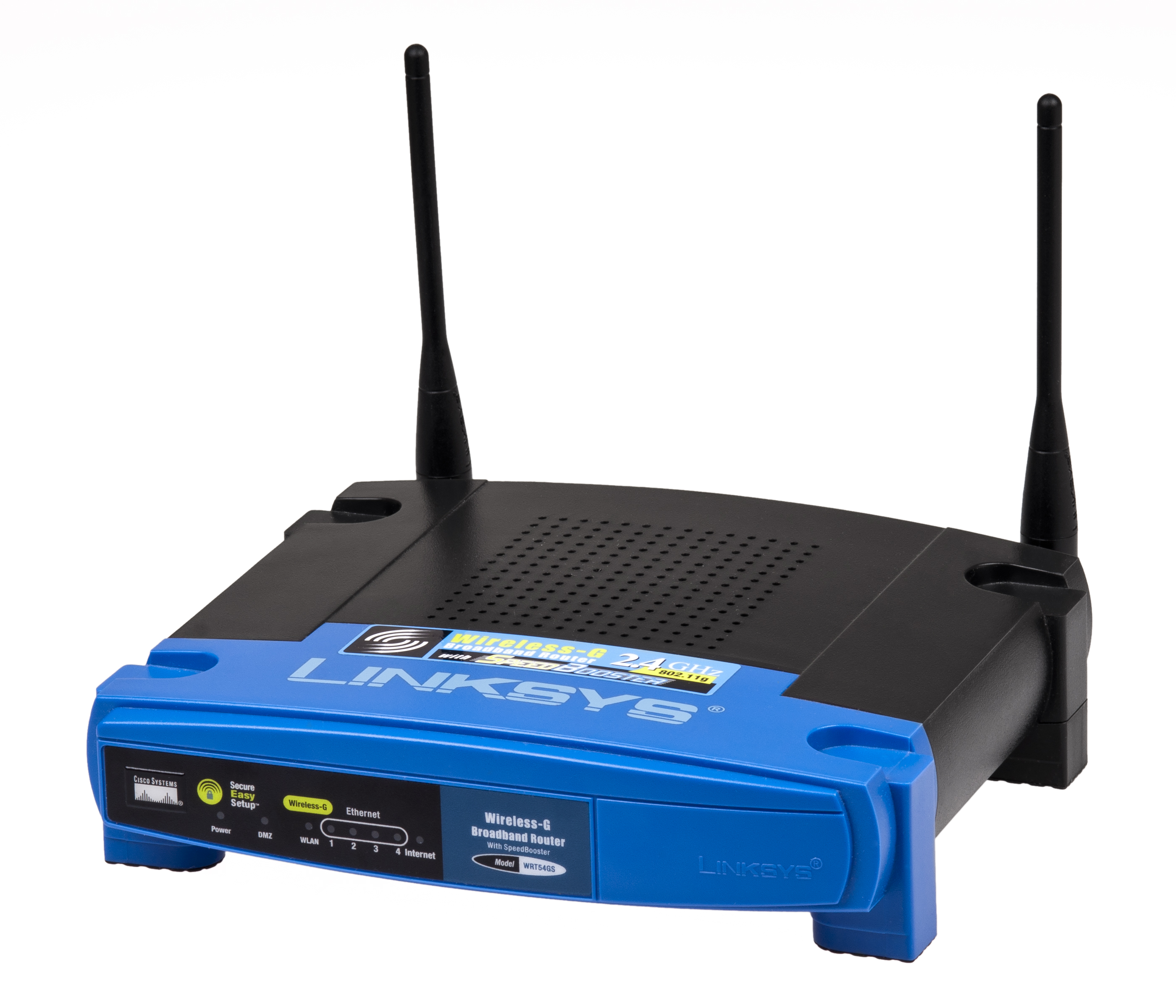
A ubiquitous router running on the Linux kernel

Due to its low cost and ease of customization, Linux is often used in embedded systems. In the non-mobile telecommunications equipment sector, the majority of customer-premises equipment (CPE) hardware runs some Linux-based operating system. OpenWrt is a community-driven example upon which many of the OEM firmware releases are based.

For example, the TiVo digital video recorder also uses a customized Linux, as do several network firewalls and routers from such makers as Cisco/Linksys. The Korg OASYS, the Korg KRONOS, the Yamaha Motif XS/Motif XF music workstations, Yamaha S90XS/S70XS, Yamaha MOX6/MOX8 synthesizers, Yamaha Motif-Rack XS tone generator module, and Roland RD-700GX digital piano also run Linux. Linux is also used in stage lighting control systems, such as the WholeHogIII console.

== Gaming ==
In the past, there were few games available for Linux. In recent years, more games have been released with support for Linux (especially Indie games), with the exception of a few AAA title games. Android, a mobile platform which uses the Linux kernel, has gained much developer interest and is one of the main platforms for mobile game development along with iOS operating system by Apple for iPhone and iPad devices.

On February 14, 2013, Valve released a Linux version of Steam, a gaming distribution platform on PC. Many Steam games were ported to Linux. On December 13, 2013, Valve released SteamOS, a gaming-oriented OS based on Debian, for beta testing, and had plans to ship Steam Machines as a gaming and entertainment platform. Valve has also developed VOGL, an OpenGL debugger intended to aid video game development, as well as porting its Source game engine to desktop Linux. As a result of Valve's effort, several prominent games such as DotA 2, Team Fortress 2, Portal, Portal 2 and Left 4 Dead 2 are now natively available on desktop Linux.

On July 31, 2013, Nvidia released Shield as an attempt to use Android as a specialized gaming platform.

Some Linux users play Windows-based games using Wine or CrossOver Linux.

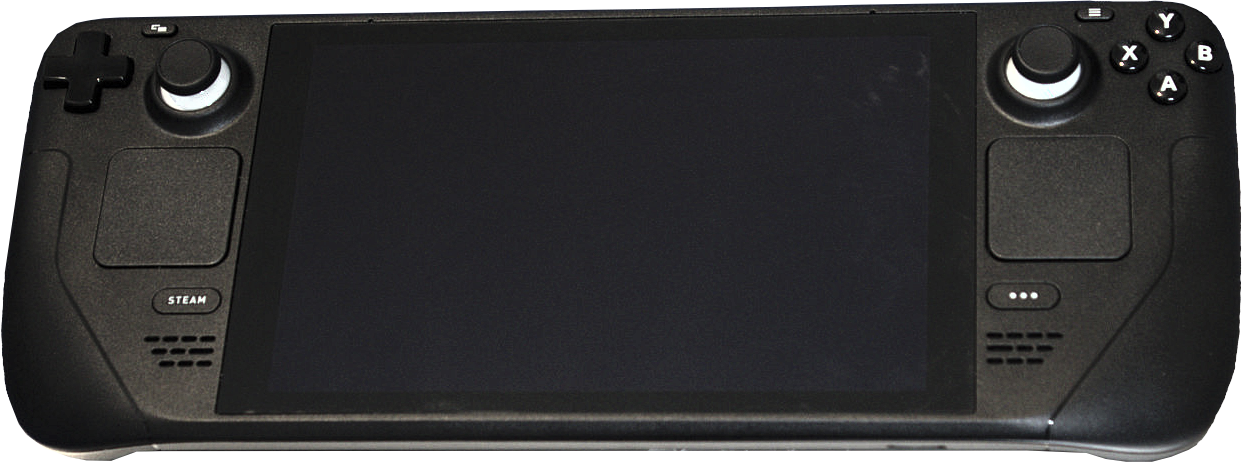
Steam Deck, a handheld gaming console running Linux-based operating system

On August 22, 2018, Valve released their own fork of Wine called Proton, aimed at gaming. It features some improvements over the vanilla Wine such as Vulkan-based DirectX 11 and 12 implementations, Steam integration, better full screen and game controller support and improved performance for multi-threaded games.

In 2021, ProtonDB, an online aggregator of games supporting Linux, stated that 78% of the top thousand games on Steam were able to run on Linux using either Proton or a native port.

On February 25, 2022, Valve released Steam Deck, a handheld gaming console running Arch Linux-based operating system SteamOS 3.0.

== Specialized uses ==
Due to the flexibility, customizability and free and open-source nature of Linux, it becomes possible to highly tailor Linux towards a specific purpose. There are two main methods to assemble a specialized Linux distribution: building from scratch or from a general-purpose distribution as a base. The distributions often used for this purpose include Debian, Fedora, Ubuntu (which is itself based on Debian), Arch Linux, Gentoo, and Slackware. In contrast, Linux distributions built from scratch do not have general-purpose bases; instead, they focus on the JeOS philosophy by including only necessary components and avoiding resource overhead caused by components considered redundant in the distribution's use cases.

=== Home theater PC ===
A home theater PC (HTPC) is a PC that is mainly used as an entertainment system, especially a home theater system. It is normally connected to a television, and often an additional audio system.

OpenELEC, a Linux distribution that incorporates the media center software Kodi, is an OS tuned specifically for an HTPC. Having been built from the ground up adhering to the JeOS principle, the OS is very lightweight and very suitable for the confined usage range of an HTPC.

There are also special editions of Linux distributions that include the MythTV media center software, such as Mythbuntu, a special edition of Ubuntu.

=== Digital security ===
Kali Linux is a Debian-based Linux distribution designed for digital forensics and penetration testing. It comes preinstalled with several software applications for penetration testing and identifying security exploits. The Ubuntu derivative BackBox provides pre-installed security and network analysis tools for ethical hacking.
The Arch-based BlackArch includes over 2100 tools for pentesting and security researching.

There are many Linux distributions created with privacy, secrecy, network anonymity and information security in mind, including Tails, Tin Hat Linux and Tinfoil Hat Linux. Lightweight Portable Security is a distribution based on Arch Linux and developed by the United States Department of Defense. Tor-ramdisk is a minimal distribution created solely to host the network anonymity software Tor.

=== System rescue ===
Linux Live CD sessions have long been used as a tool for recovering data from a broken computer system and for repairing the system. Building upon that idea, several Linux distributions tailored for this purpose have emerged, most of which use GParted as a partition editor, with additional data recovery and system repair software:

- GParted Live – a Debian-based distribution developed by the GParted project.
- Parted Magic – a commercial Linux distribution.
- SystemRescueCD – an Arch-based distribution with support for editing Windows registry.

=== In space ===
SpaceX uses multiple redundant flight computers in a fault-tolerant design in its Falcon 9 rocket. Each Merlin engine is controlled by three voting computers, with two physical processors per computer that constantly check each other's operation. Linux is not inherently fault-tolerant (no operating system is, as it is a function of the whole system including the hardware), but the flight computer software makes it so for its purpose. For flexibility, commercial off-the-shelf parts and system-wide "radiation-tolerant" design are used instead of radiation hardened parts. As of July 2019, SpaceX has conducted over 76 launches of the Falcon 9 since 2010, out of which all but one have successfully delivered their primary payloads to the intended orbit, and has used it to transport astronauts to the International Space Station. The Dragon 2 crew capsule also uses Linux.

Windows was deployed as the operating system on non-mission critical laptops used on the space station, but it was later replaced with Linux. Robonaut 2, the first humanoid robot in space, is also Linux-based.

The Jet Propulsion Laboratory has used Linux for a number of years "to help with projects relating to the construction of unmanned space flight and deep space exploration"; NASA uses Linux in robotics in the Mars rover, and Ubuntu Linux to "save data from satellites".

=== Education ===
Linux distributions have been created to provide hands-on experience with coding and source code to students, on devices such as the Raspberry Pi. In addition to producing a practical device, the intention is to show students "how things work under the hood".

The Ubuntu derivatives Edubuntu and The Linux Schools Project, as well as the Debian derivative Skolelinux, provide education-oriented software packages. They also include tools for administering and building school computer labs and computer-based classrooms, such as the Linux Terminal Server Project (LTSP).

=== Others ===
Instant WebKiosk and Webconverger are browser-based Linux distributions often used in web kiosks and digital signage. Thinstation is a minimalist distribution designed for thin clients. Rocks Cluster Distribution is tailored for high-performance computing clusters.

There are general-purpose Linux distributions that target a specific audience, such as users of a specific language or geographical area. Such examples include Ubuntu Kylin for Chinese language users and BlankOn targeted at Indonesians. Profession-specific distributions include Ubuntu Studio for media creation and DNALinux for bioinformatics. There is also a Muslim-oriented distribution of the name Sabily that consequently also provides some Islamic tools. Certain organizations use slightly specialized Linux distributions internally, including GendBuntu used by the French National Gendarmerie, Goobuntu used internally by Google, and Astra Linux developed specifically for the Russian army.

== See also ==
- Linux on Apple devices
