= Havoc Pennington =

American computer engineer and entrepreneur

- Born: Robert Sanford Havoc Pennington c. 1976
- Occupation: Computer programmer
- Employer: Tidelift
- Known for: Linux, GNOME development

Robert Sanford Havoc Pennington (born c. 1976) is an American computer engineer and entrepreneur. He is known in the free software movement due to his work on HAL, GNOME, Metacity, GConf, and D-Bus.

== History ==
Havoc Pennington graduated from the University of Chicago in 1998. After graduation, he worked at Red Hat as a Desktop manager/engineer for nine years, ending in 2008. He also founded the project freedesktop.org in 2000. He promoted the idea of the Gnome Online Desktop in 2007. For a time, he led the development of the 2006–2009 Mugshot project. From 2008 until June 2011, he worked on a consumer product for the startup company Litl (hardware, and proprietary software and services). From 2011 to 2015 he worked for Typesafe (now Lightbend). In 2017 he cofounded Tidelift, which seeks to improve the ecosystem around open source software by providing support for professional teams using open source and helping maintainers build sustainable businesses around their projects.

== Publications ==
- Havoc Pennington, GTK+ /Gnome Application Development, Sams, ISBN 978-0735700789, 1999.
