= Portland Project =

The Portland Project is an initiative by freedesktop.org aiming at easing the portability of application software between desktop environments and kernels by designing cross-platform APIs and offering implementations thereof as libraries to independent software vendors (ISVs).

The project was taken to establish a greater foothold of Linux and other Unix-like operating systems in the desktop market. It aims at resolving a number of key factors that are believed to reduce the adoption rate of Linux distributions as operating system of choice for desktop computers at home or in the office.

While the Tango Desktop Project was started to give users a more unified graphical experience, the Portland Project is intended to ease the porting of desktop applications to Linux for independent software vendors (ISVs). The project goal is to let software developers worry less about the desktop environment a distribution is using, and thus bring it on more common ground with Microsoft Windows and macOS in this particular area.

In 2006, the project released Portland 1.0 (xdg-utils; "Cross Desktop Group Utilities"), a set of common interfaces for desktop environments. A key part of the interface is a common MIME type database for icons and programs associated with file types.

The project has Alex Graveley (GNOME) and George Staikos (KDE) as two of the task force leaders, who will look to gain feedback from ISVs, integration possibilities, and possibly create a draft implementation as well.

The initial Portland Project meeting, held in Portland, Oregon, was sponsored by the Open Source Development Labs (the predecessor of the Linux Foundation). At the start of that initial meeting, Nat Friedman of Novell came up with the project name: "well, we are here in Portland... how about the Portland Project?"
