= Mugshot (website) =

Social networking website

- Website type: Social network service
- Owner: Red Hat

Mugshot was a social networking website created by Red Hat. Unlike most other social networking websites, which are concerned with advertising, Mugshot offered a desktop client and web widgets.

Mugshot was meant to facilitate real-world interactions with friends and make one's normal computer use more social. It provided the functionality of a social network aggregator.

== Licensing ==
The software that ran the Mugshot site is free software, and most of the client code is distributed under the terms of the GNU General Public License (GPL). Various parts of the server code are distributed under the GPL, the Open Software License 3.0, the Apache License, and the MIT License, all of which are free software licences.

== Features ==
Site features included Web Swarm, which allowed users to share web links and participate in conversations about them. Another feature was Music Radar, which displayed the songs a user was listening to and enabled conversations about the music.

Mugshot also integrated with various other sites, including Twitter, Delicious, Digg, Facebook, Flickr, last.fm and YouTube. Numerous features were planned, including "TV Party."

== Current status ==
From April 4 until May 11, 2009, the Mugshot website, mugshot.org, was inaccessible and displayed the message: "Mugshot is currently not running." The website no longer resolves.

The mugshot SVN is still being maintained and hosted by Red Hat. There will be no further updates to the code base from the original development team from Red Hat.
