= GNOME 2 =

Second major release of GNOME

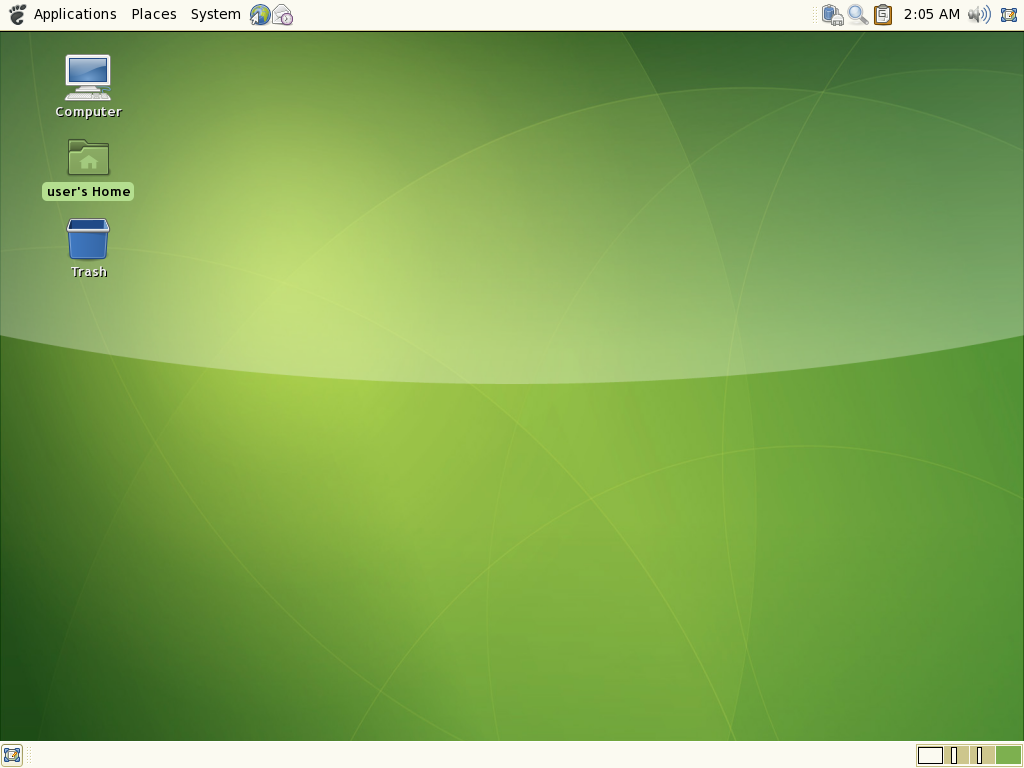
- GNOME 2.18 desktop with Panel
- Developer: GNOME Project
- Release: 26 June 2002; 24 years ago
- Written in: C
- Operating system: Unix-like
- Platform: GTK
- Predecessor: GNOME 1
- Successor: GNOME 3, MATE
- Type: Desktop environment
- License: GPL-2.0-only
- Website: gnome.org (archived at Wayback Machine)

GNOME 2 is the second major release of the GNOME desktop environment. Building upon the release of GNOME 1, development of GNOME 2 focused on a greater design-oriented approach that simplified and standardized elements of the environment. It also introduced modern font and image rendering, with improved accessibility and internationalisation, and improved performance. It was released on 26 June 2002 at the Linux Symposium.

Although officially superseded by GNOME 3, and no longer actively maintained, GNOME 2 became the basis for the MATE desktop environment, which actively continues development. It also helped to inspire the Cinnamon desktop environment, and the GNOME Flashback shell session, which both largely retain a similar user experience to GNOME 2, but with modern components.

== Features ==
GNOME 2's initial release was largely an evolution of the final release of GNOME 1, that had introduced both Nautilus (today known as GNOME Files) as its file manager, and Sawfish as its window manager. However, in an effort to simplify its implementation, by the second release of GNOME 2, the Metacity window manager had been adopted. With that, it also included an official look and feel, as it adopted the Clearlooks theme. For the first time, the GNOME human interface guidelines were published, which attempted to improve overall usability. Tearable (detachable) menus were discontinued by default.

GNOME 2 continued with the general desktop metaphor paradigm that GNOME 1 started. An evolved GNOME Panel remained as its shell. Users saw the addition of font anti-aliasing, which gave the desktop environment a more refined look in its text rendering.

As GNOME 2's release cycle spanned the course of over eight years, many component libraries and core applications were introduced and replaced at various points. GStreamer, a multimedia framework, was introduced in 2.2, which later allowed for the inclusion of the Totem multimedia player (known today as GNOME Videos). Epiphany (known today as GNOME Web) was introduced in 2.4. Evince (also known today as GNOME Document Viewer) replaced both GPdf and GGV in version 2.12.

GNOME 1 had implemented the CORBA-compliant object request broker known as ORBit to serve as its message-oriented middleware. In version 2.2, this middleware was deprecated in favor of the more environment-agnostic D-Bus. As a result, Bonobo, a software framework for object-linking in compound documents that had been built-upon ORBit, was also phased-out.

Although greater overall standardization was a major goal of GNOME 2, it also provided increased functionality in customization, as version 2.2 supported the ability for full icon themes to be applied for the first time.

== Development ==
Discussion around GNOME 2 began as early as 1999, following the initial release of GNOME 1, when Federico Mena published an early draft roadmap. Gathering from other project leaders Miguel de Icaza and Havoc Pennington, the roadmap roughly detailed overall goals, their dependencies, and time to completion. As early as February 2000, the GNOME Project publicly outlined a plan to have an SDK available by the end of the calendar year. During the first GUADEC which took place the following month, a non-authoritative GNOME 2.0 steering committee was formed, and an updated timeline was created.

On 13 February 2001, the GNOME Foundation Board of Directors met for a special meeting and discussed the launch of GNOME 2. Project co-founder Miguel de Icaza also outlined key points, including which technologies should be adopted via a public document. It was agreed that GNOME 2 should be based-on GTK 2 widget toolkit.

Spearheaded by the GNOME Human Computer Interaction team of Sun Microsystems led by Calum Benson, a study was conducted in March 2001, to survey usability of GNOME 1.0. Following, Havoc Pennington, then published an essay titled "Free software and good user interfaces", which advocated for improvement in user interface design, and noted efforts in the upcoming GNOME 2 release. This culminated in the creation of the GNOME Usability Project, which handled publishing of an accompanying set of human interface guidelines. This helped to standardize interface elements in the desktop environment.

GNOME 2 was released on 26 June 2002 at the Linux Symposium in Ottawa. Starting with GNOME 2.4, a timed release cadence was adopted, which called for a new version to be released roughly every six months. This effectively resulted in new stable GNOME versions being released every September and March of any given year. This practice is still continued in the modern GNOME release cadence.

Version history
Version	Release date	Notes
2.0	26 June 2002	Initial release
2.2	5 February 2003	
2.4	10 September 2003	
2.6	31 March 2004	
2.8	15 September 2004	
2.10	9 March 2005	
2.12	7 September 2005	
2.14	15 April 2006	
2.16	6 September 2006	
2.18	14 March 2007	
2.20	19 September 2007	
2.22	12 March 2008	
2.24	24 September 2008	
2.26	18 March 2009	
2.28	23 September 2009	
2.30	31 March 2010	
2.32	29 September 2010	Lastest and final update of GNOME 2.X series

== System requirements ==
System requirements
Requirement	Minimum	Recommended
Unix-like
Operating system	BSD, Darwin, HP-UX, Linux, Solaris	
CPU	Pentium, 166 MHz	Pentium, 400 MHz
Memory	64 MB	128 MB
Free space	341 MB	

== Gallery ==
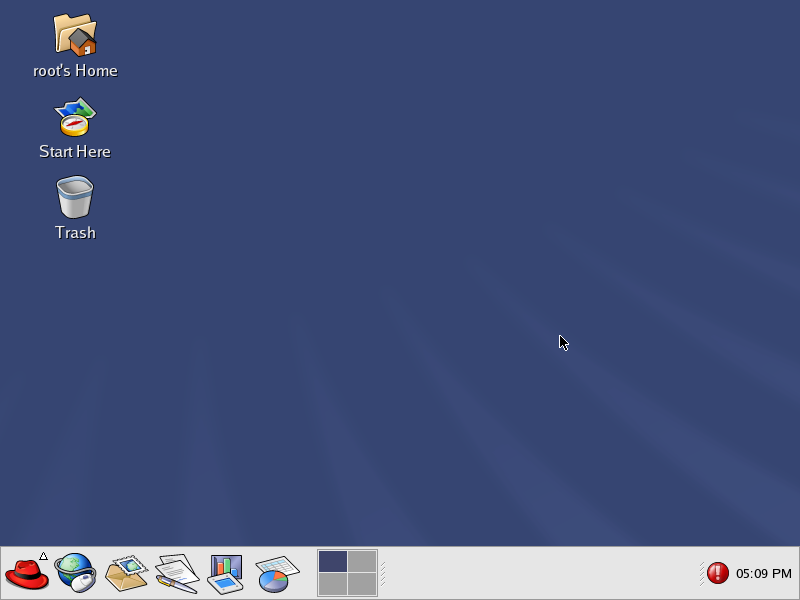
GNOME 2.0 on Red Hat Linux 8 (no top panel)

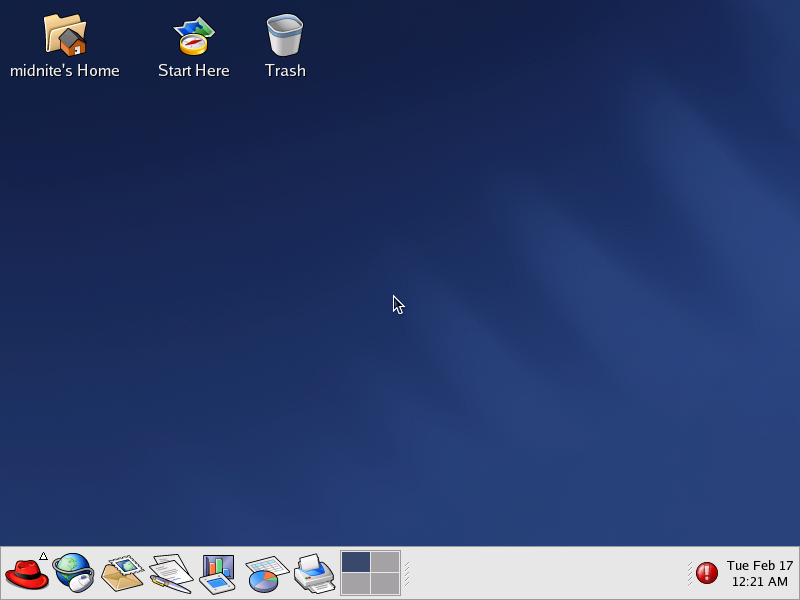
GNOME 2.2 on Red Hat Linux 9 (with no top panel)

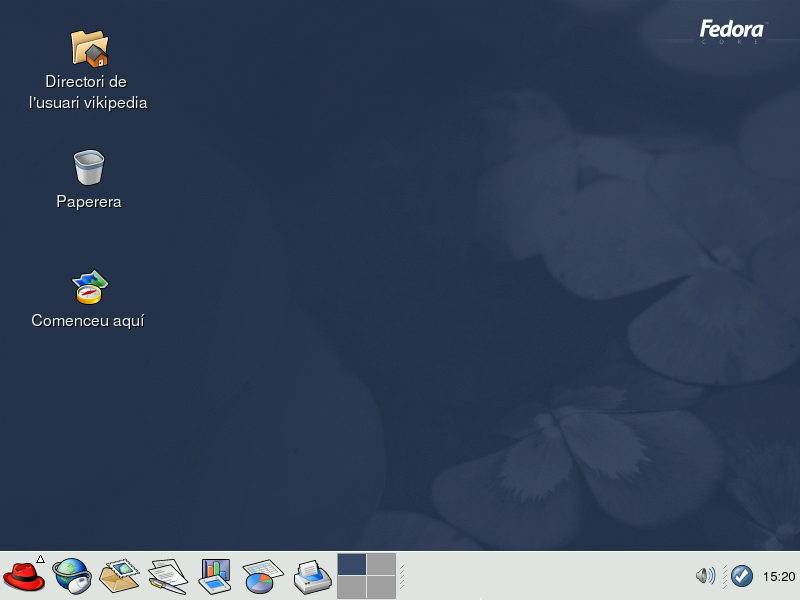
GNOME 2.4 on Fedora Core 1 (with no top panel)

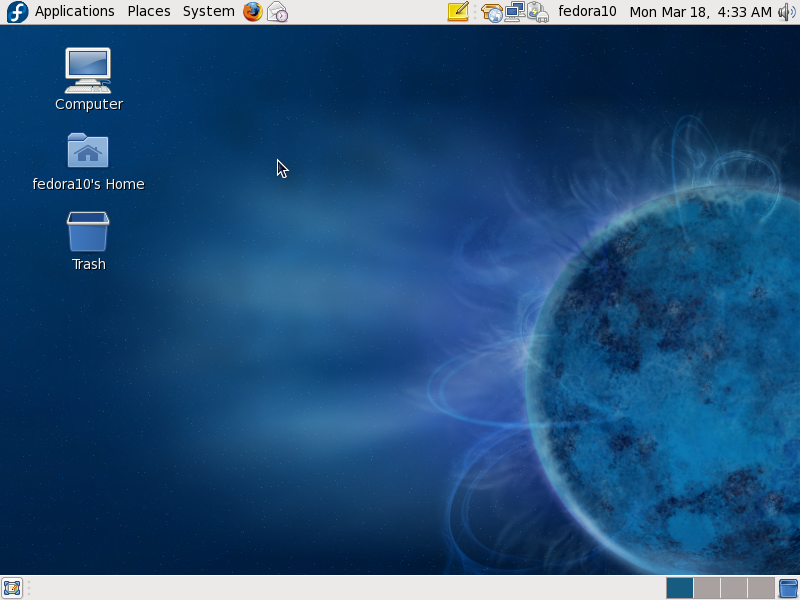
GNOME 2.24 on Fedora 10

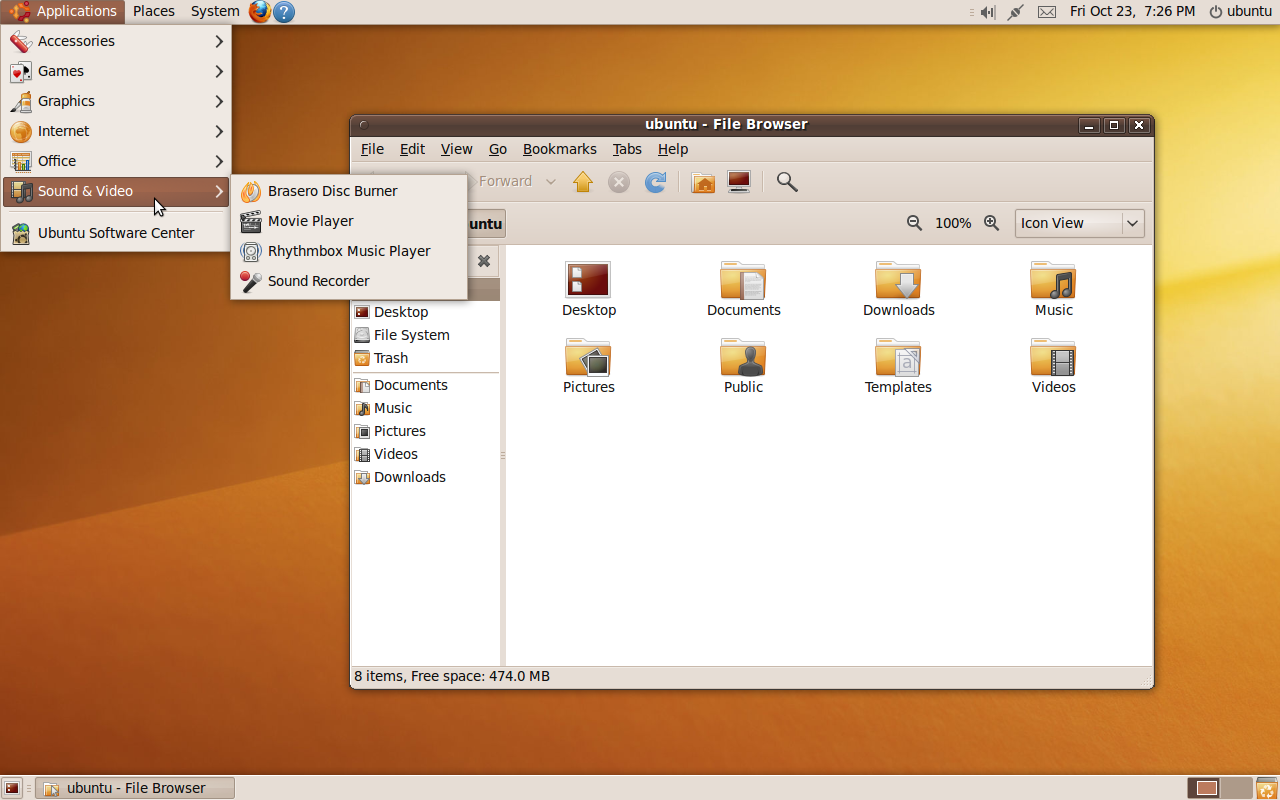
GNOME 2.28 on Ubuntu 9.10 with Ubuntu's Human theme applied

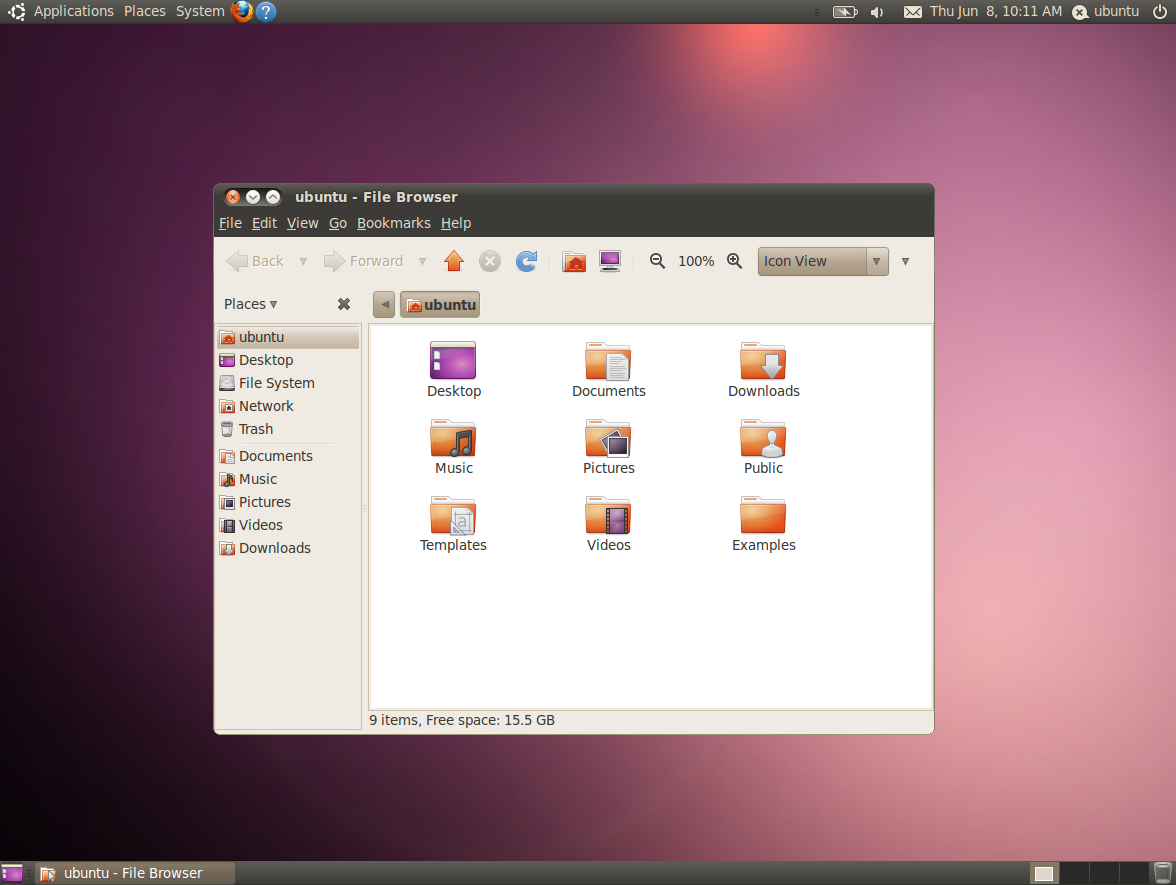
GNOME 2.30 on Ubuntu 10.04 LTS with Ubuntu theming

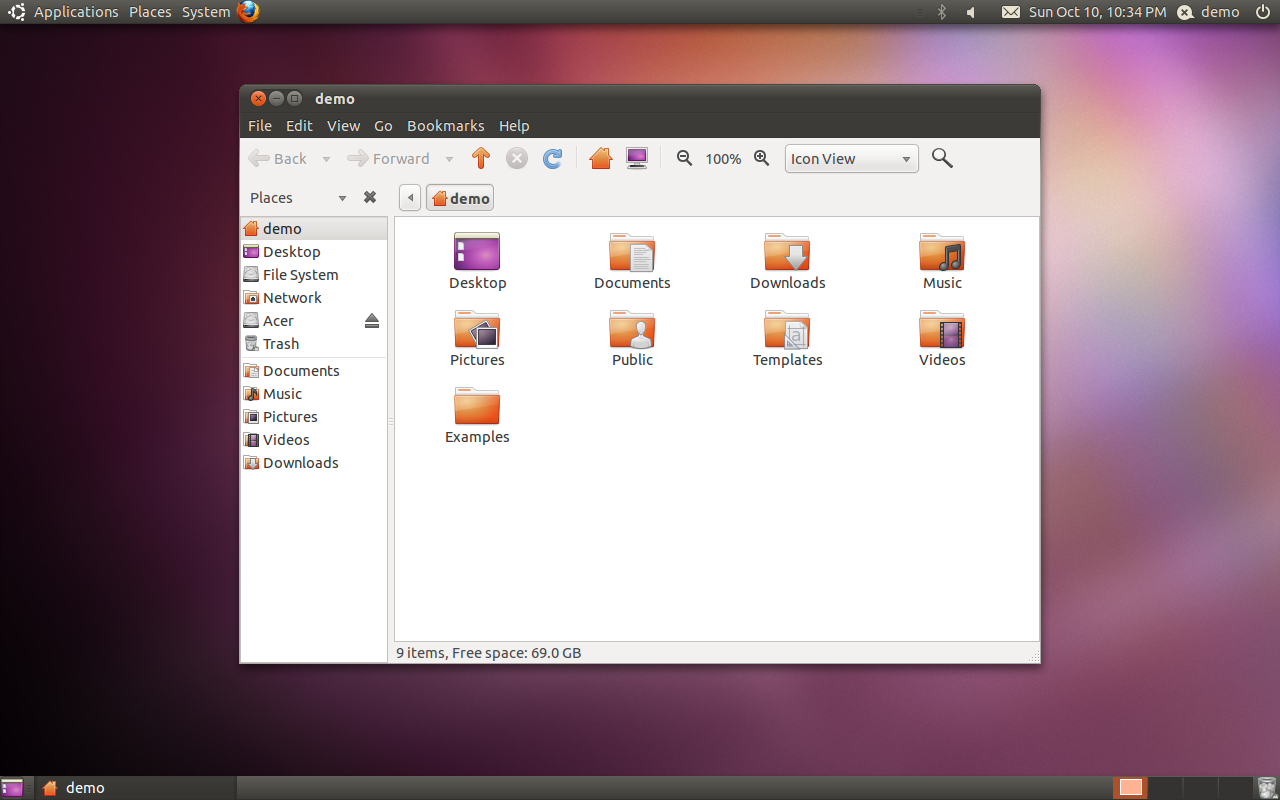
GNOME 2.32 on Ubuntu 10.10 with Ubuntu theming

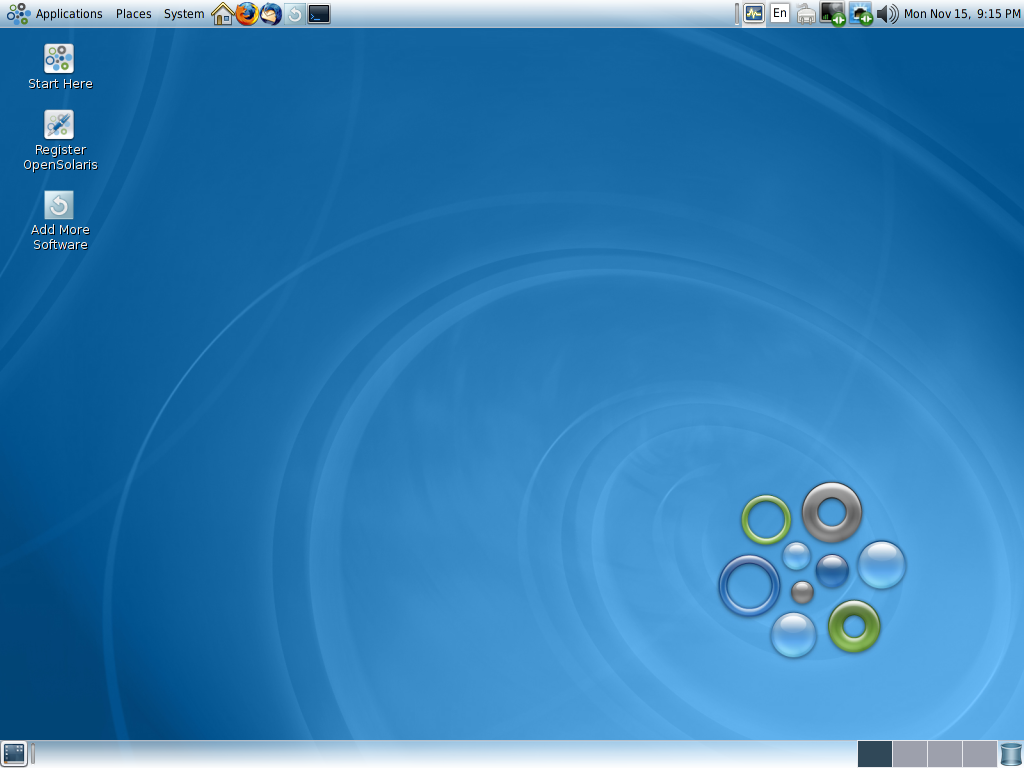
GNOME 2 on OpenSolaris

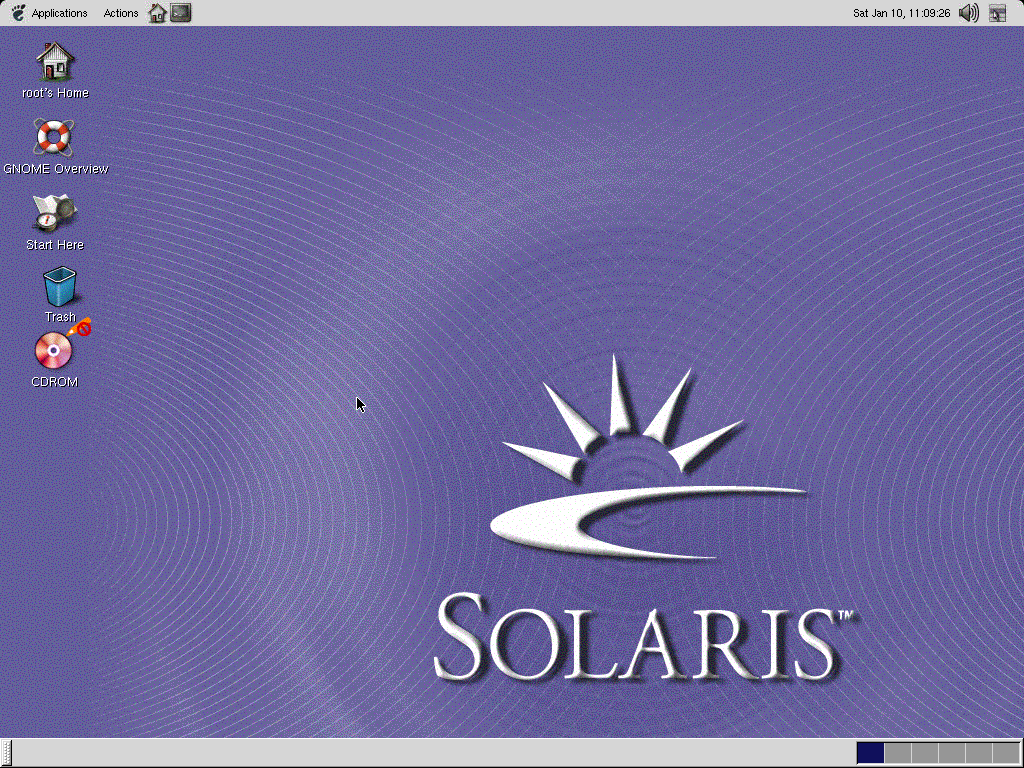
Solaris 9 with GNOME 2.0
