= Wmctrl =

wmctrl is a command used to control windows in EWMH- and NetWM-compatible X Window window managers. Some of its common operations are list, resize, and close window. It also has the ability to interact with virtual desktops and give information about the window manager. wmctrl is a command-line program, however, it has some functions that allow the mouse to select a window for an operation.

== Operations ==
wmctrl operations

- List all desktops
- List all windows
- Switch desktop of a window
- Close window
- Resize window
- Move window
- Set window's icon name
- Set window title
- Add, remove, or toggle windows properties
  - modal
  - sticky
  - maximized_vert
  - maximized_horz
  - shaded
  - skip_taskbar
  - skip_pager, hidden
  - fullscreen
  - above
  - below
- Move window to another desktop
- Change geometry (common size) of desktops
- Display information about the window manager
- Change number of desktops

== Compatible window managers ==
Compatible, or mostly compatible, window managers

- Blackbox ≥ version 0.70
- IceWM
- KWin (the default WM for KDE)
- Metacity (the default WM for GNOME 2, replaced by Mutter in GNOME 3)
- Openbox ≥ 3 (the default WM of Lubuntu)
- sawfish
- FVWM ≥ 2.5
- waimea
- PekWM
- enlightenment ≥ 0.16.6
- Xfwm ≥ 4 (the default WM for Xfce)
- Fluxbox ≥ 0.9.6
- matchbox
- Window Maker ≥ 0.91
- compiz
- Awesome
- Xmonad
- Qubes
- Qtile
