= GNOME 1 =

First major release of GNOME

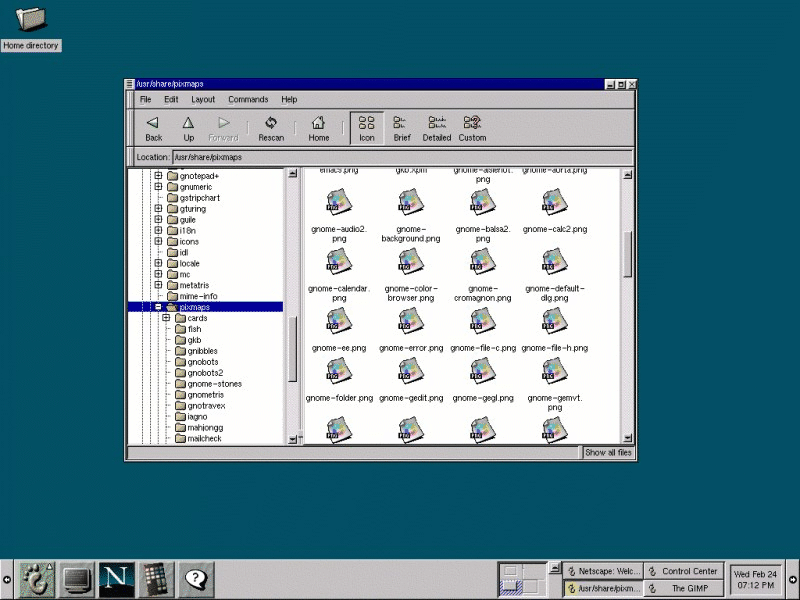
- GNOME 1.0 desktop with Panel and file manager
- Other names: GNU Network Object Model Environment
- Developer: GNOME Project
- Release: March 3, 1999; 27 years ago
- Final release: 1.4 / April 2, 2001; 25 years ago
- Written in: C
- Operating system: Unix-like
- Platform: GTK
- Successor: GNOME 2
- Type: Desktop environment
- License: GPL-2.0-only
- Website: gnome.org (archived at Wayback Machine)

GNOME 1 is the first major release of the GNOME desktop environment. Its primary goal was to provide a consistent user-friendly environment in conjunction with the X Window System. It was also a modern and free and open source software alternative to older desktop environments such as the Common Desktop Environment (CDE), but also to the K Desktop Environment (KDE). Each desktop environment was built-upon then proprietary-licensed widget toolkits (Motif and Qt respectively), whereas GNOME's goal from the onset, was to be freely-licensed, and utilize the GTK toolkit instead.

GNOME 1 was announced on August 15, 1997, and received its first release on March 3, 1999. Miguel de Icaza served as the primary architect, while other key developers included Federico Mena Quintero (then GIMP maintainer), and Elliot Lee. The three are considered founders of the project. Red Hat, who employed Mena and Lee, also provided development resources through its "Red Hat Advanced Development Labs" (RHAD), which was founded to tackle usability issues for Linux. The project was affiliated with the GNU Project during this time.

== Features ==
Along with the Desktop, the GNOME Panel provides the core functionality for the interface. It features a primary button, stylized with the GNOME logo, known as the "Main Menu Button". On each side of the Panel, arrow icons are displayed that toggle it to be hidden or visible. It also holds customizable applets that allow for smaller individual functionalities such as a clock for viewing system time. Another applet, the GNOME Pager, allows the Panel to serve as a taskbar, and a mechanism for utilizing virtual desktops.

Accessible from the Main Menu button is GNOME's centralized configuration known as the GNOME Control Center. Like the Panel with its applets, each setting is modularized with individual setting tools known as "capplets". Capplets available with a default installation of GNOME include settings for modifying the Desktop's background with a wallpaper image or basic colors, screensaver properties, etc.

GNOME 1's initial project scope did not include an official window manager, but instead intended to be interoperable with any window manager that implemented GNOME compliance with the Pager and Desktop. In its initial implementations, Enlightenment was the default and only fully-compliant window manager. However, GNOME 1 did eventually include an official window manager in its final version release with Sawfish. The window manager that GNOME uses is configurable from within the Control Center.

== Development ==
In 1996, KDE began development of a desktop environment to provide a unified behavior and appearance of applications for Unix-like systems. KDE adopted Trolltech's Qt widget toolkit for use in its graphical interface, which was licensed under the Qt Free Edition License. However, it was noted by Richard Stallman that such a license was not compatible as free software because it did not allow for modification of its source code.

While Elliot Lee was working for Red Hat as a webmaster, he collaborated with Miguel de Icaza in an eventually unfinished attempt to create a common library for applications on the Linux platform. De Icaza, while studying at UNAM, recruited two fellow students, Arturo Espinosa and Federico Mena Quintero, to contribute to free and open-source software. Mena became a developer of GIMP in 1996, and wrote the Gradient Editor. The GIMP project's original authors, Peter Mattis and Spencer Kimball, had decided to transition away from the Motif widget toolkit by creating a new widget toolkit that became known as GTK that same year.

Prior to development of the GNOME desktop environment, the name referred to an acronym for the "GNU Network Object Model Environment", which was intended to be an open implementation of an inter-process communication ABI similar to Microsoft's Component Object Model (COM). Meeting Nat Friedman on the LinuxNet IRC network years prior, De Icaza and Friedman eventually met face-to-face in the Summer of 1997, when mutual friend Randy Chapman invited De Icaza to interview with Microsoft as a developer to port Internet Explorer to the Solaris/SPARC platform. At this time, De Icaza became aware of COM, and started working with Mena to create a free and open source version for Unix-like operating systems. This original effort was eventually released, but became known as "Bonobo" instead.

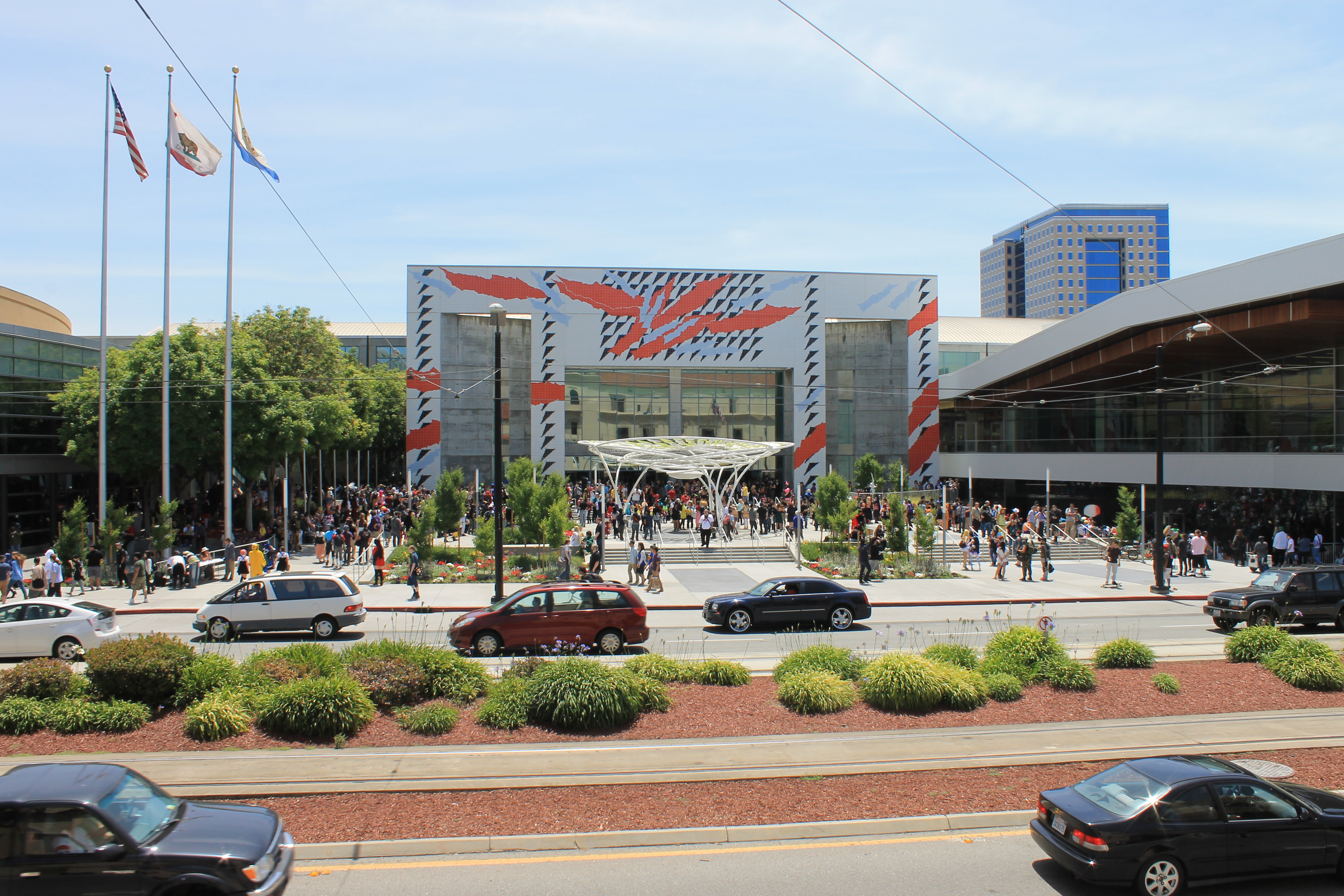
GNOME 1 debuted at the 1999 LinuxWorld Conference and Expo held at the San Jose Convention Center

GNOME 1.0 publicly debuted on March 3, 1999 at the LinuxWorld Conference and Expo in San Jose, California. The first Linux distribution to ship with GNOME as its default desktop environment was Red Hat Linux 6.0 released the following month.

Version history
Version	Release date	Code name	Notes
1.0	March 3, 1999		Initial release
1.2	May 25, 2000	Bongo	
1.4	April 2, 2001	Tranquility	Incorporated Nautilus file manager and Sawfish window manager

== Reception ==
Red Hat provided early sponsorship for GNOME, and established its Red Hat Advanced Development (RHAD) Labs in order to give direct code and programming resources. Together with Nat Friedman, Miguel De Icaza formed the software company Ximian, which largely revolved around GNOME and related application support. Eazel, led by former Apple Computer engineer Andy Hertzfeld in Palo Alto, formed in 1999 and contributed the Nautilus file manager (known today as "GNOME Files"). Nautilus was released in 2001, and became the default file manager.

In 2000, Sun Microsystems announced that GNOME 1 would replace the Common Desktop Environment on their Solaris operating system. Hewlett-Packard did the same for HP-UX. Many Linux distributions adopted GNOME 1 including Red Hat Linux and Debian. Other Unix-like operating systems such as FreeBSD followed.

The non-profit GNOME Foundation was established by Compaq, IBM, VA Linux Systems, Sun Microsystems, Red Hat, Eazel, and Ximian to create a coordinating effort. In addition, an annual conference centered around GNOME, the GNOME Users And Developers European Conference (known thereafter as simply "GUADEC"), began in France in 2000. GTK, as a project, associated themselves as a part of the GNOME Project's umbrella, and continued as a core piece maintained by GNOME developers.

Sean Dreilinger of CNET rated GNOME 1.4 a score of 7/10, and stated that it "does for Linux and Unix what Windows did for DOS".
