= Bluecurve =

Desktop theme for GNOME and KDE

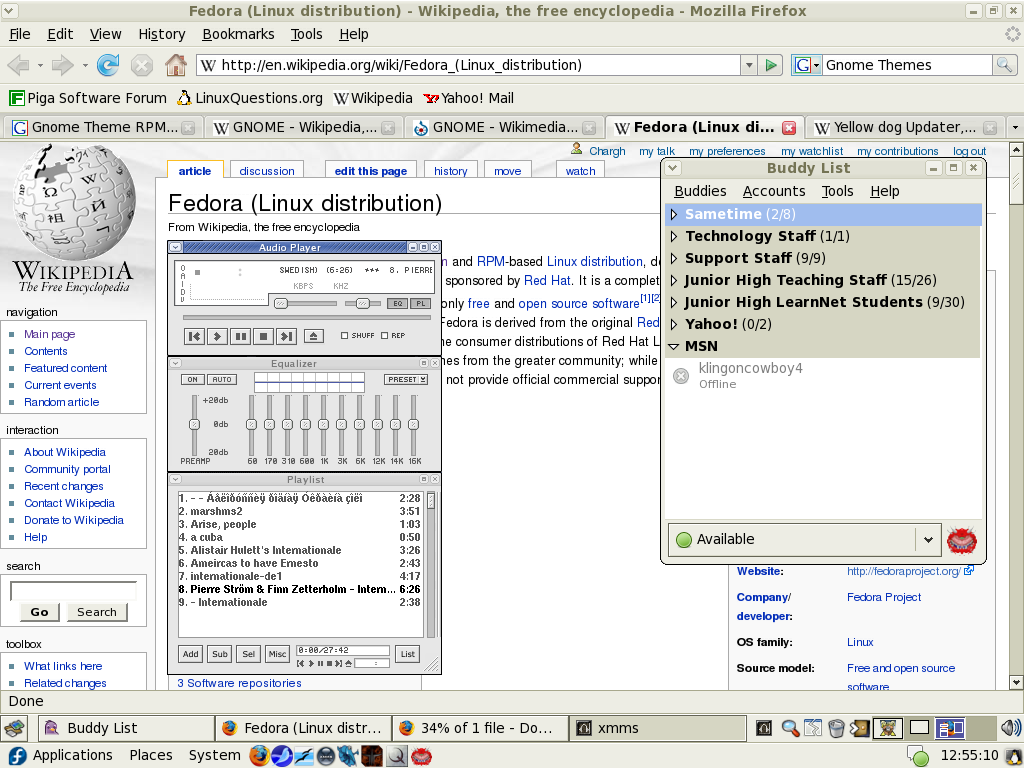
Bluecurve in use with Fedora 7

Bluecurve is a desktop theme for GNOME and KDE created by the Red Hat Artwork project. The main aim of Bluecurve was to create a consistent look throughout the Linux environment, and provide support for various Freedesktop.org desktop standards. It was used in Red Hat Linux in version 8 and 9, and in its successor OS, Fedora Linux through version 4.

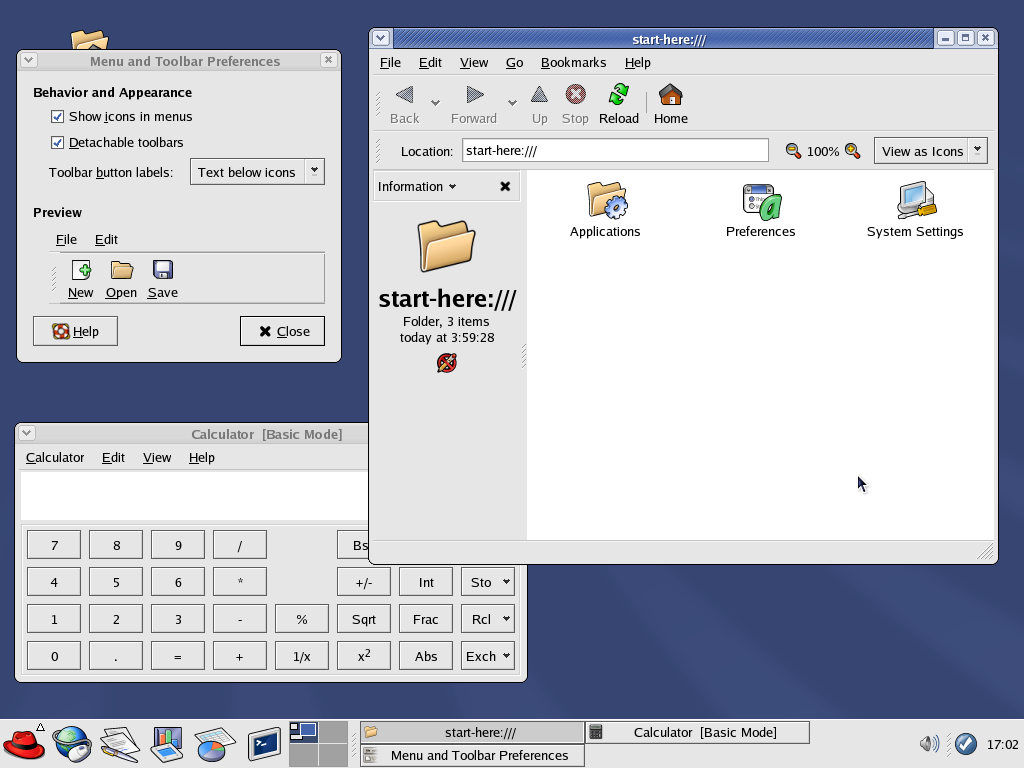
Bluecurve in use with Fedora Core 1 (Yarrow) on the GNOME 2.4 Desktop

The Bluecurve window borders and GTK theme were replaced by those from Clearlooks (the former in Fedora Core 4, and the latter in Fedora Core 5). The Bluecurve icon set remained installed in Fedora 7, but was replaced as the default by Echo.

There had been controversy surrounding the theme, especially the alterations to KDE, which were sufficient to cause developer Bernhard Rosenkraenzer to quit Red Hat, "mostly in mutual agreement — I don't want to work on crippling KDE, and they don't want an employee who admits RHL 8.0's KDE is crippleware." Others simply criticized it for giving the same look to both desktops, even though they were obviously different in many ways. This approach was subsequently simulated by Mandrake Linux with their "Galaxy" theme, which was also available for GNOME and KDE, and in Kubuntu 6.06 with the GTK-Qt theme engine (enabled by default).

GUI artists have created themes in the past that simulate the Bluecurve theme on other operating systems, including Microsoft Windows.

== See also ==
- Clearlooks
- Adwaita (design language)
