= Metacity =

Window manager

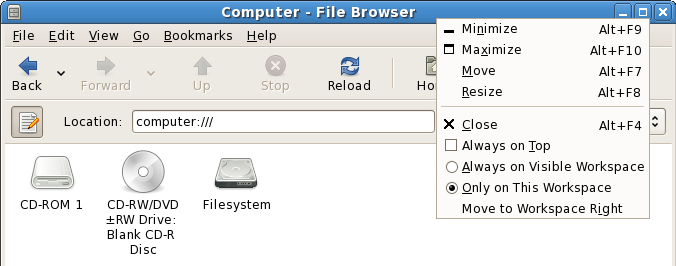
- Metacity running on GNOME
- Developer: The GNOME Project
- Initial release: 2.4.2 5 October 2002; 23 years ago
- Stable release: 3.56.0 / 26 April 2025; 12 months ago
- Written in: C
- Operating system: Linux
- Platform: GNOME
- Type: X window manager
- License: GPL-2.0-or-later
- Website: gitlab.gnome.org/GNOME/metacity
- Repository: gitlab.gnome.org/GNOME/metacity.git

Metacity (pronounced /məˈtæsɪti/) was the default window manager used by the GNOME 2 desktop environment until it was replaced by Mutter in GNOME 3. It is still used by GNOME Flashback, a session for GNOME 3 that provides a similar user experience to the Gnome 2.x series sessions.

The development of Metacity was started by Havoc Pennington and it was released under the GNU General Public License. Before the introduction of Metacity in GNOME 2.2, GNOME used Enlightenment and then Sawfish as its window manager. Although Metacity was designed to integrate into the GNOME desktop, it does not require it to run, while GNOME can be used with different window managers provided that they support the part of the ICCCM specification that GNOME requires.

Metacity uses the GTK graphical widget toolkit to create its user interface components, which makes it themeable and makes it blend in with other GTK applications. Originally, Metacity used GTK 2 however as of version 3.12.0 it has been ported to GTK 3.

== Aim ==
Metacity's focus is on simplicity and usability rather than novelties. Its author has characterized it as a "Boring window manager for the adult in you. Many window managers are like Marshmallow Froot Loops; Metacity is like Cheerios." People in favour of Metacity say that it is aimed at new computer users who do not need the abundant options and functionality of Sawfish or Enlightenment. Havoc Pennington wrote an essay explaining why he wrote Metacity and simplified the GNOME desktop.

== Themes ==
Despite the incomplete state of Metacity theme development documentation, many themes have been written for Metacity. A popular theme engine is Clearlooks, which was the default in GNOME from version 2.12 until the release of GNOME 3 and GNOME Shell.

== See also ==
- Comparison of X window managers
