= GNOME Core Applications =

Software applications built with the GNOME philosophy in mind

- Developer: The GNOME Project
- Release: December 20, 1998; 27 years ago
- Written in: C, C++, JavaScript, Python, Rust, Vala
- Operating system: Unix-like
- License: GNU General Public License
- Website: apps.gnome.org

The GNOME Core Applications (also known as Apps for GNOME) are a software suite that is packaged with GNOME, a free and open-source desktop environment. The suite provides a consistent look and feel to the GNOME desktop, utilizes the Adwaita design language and tightly integrates with the GNOME desktop. The suite is developed and maintained through GNOME's official GitLab instance.

== Configuration ==
- Settings – main interface to configure various aspects of GNOME. Diverse panels represent graphical front-ends to configure the NetworkManager daemon and other daemons.
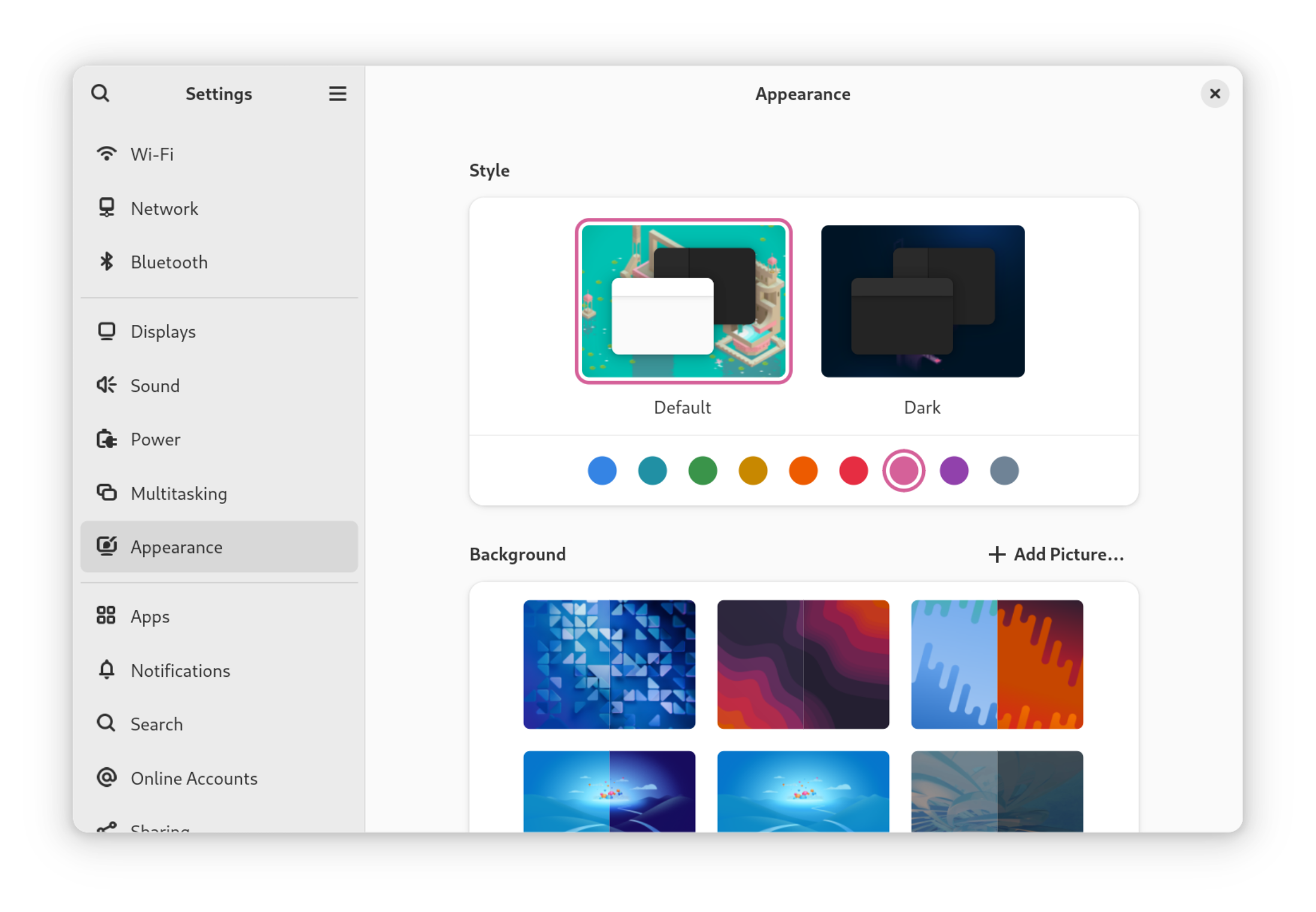
GNOME Settings

== Communication ==
- Contacts – the contacts book app

== Files ==
- Document Scanner (Simple Scan) - Application for operating printer scanners.
- Image Viewer (Loupe) – Image viewer.
- Document Viewer (Papers) – Viewer for digital documents such as PDF files. (Modern replacement for the previous core app: Evince)
- Files (Nautilus) – File manager.
- Audio Player (Decibels) - General purpose audio player.
- Video Player (Showtime) – Video player. (Modern replacement for the previous core app: Totem)
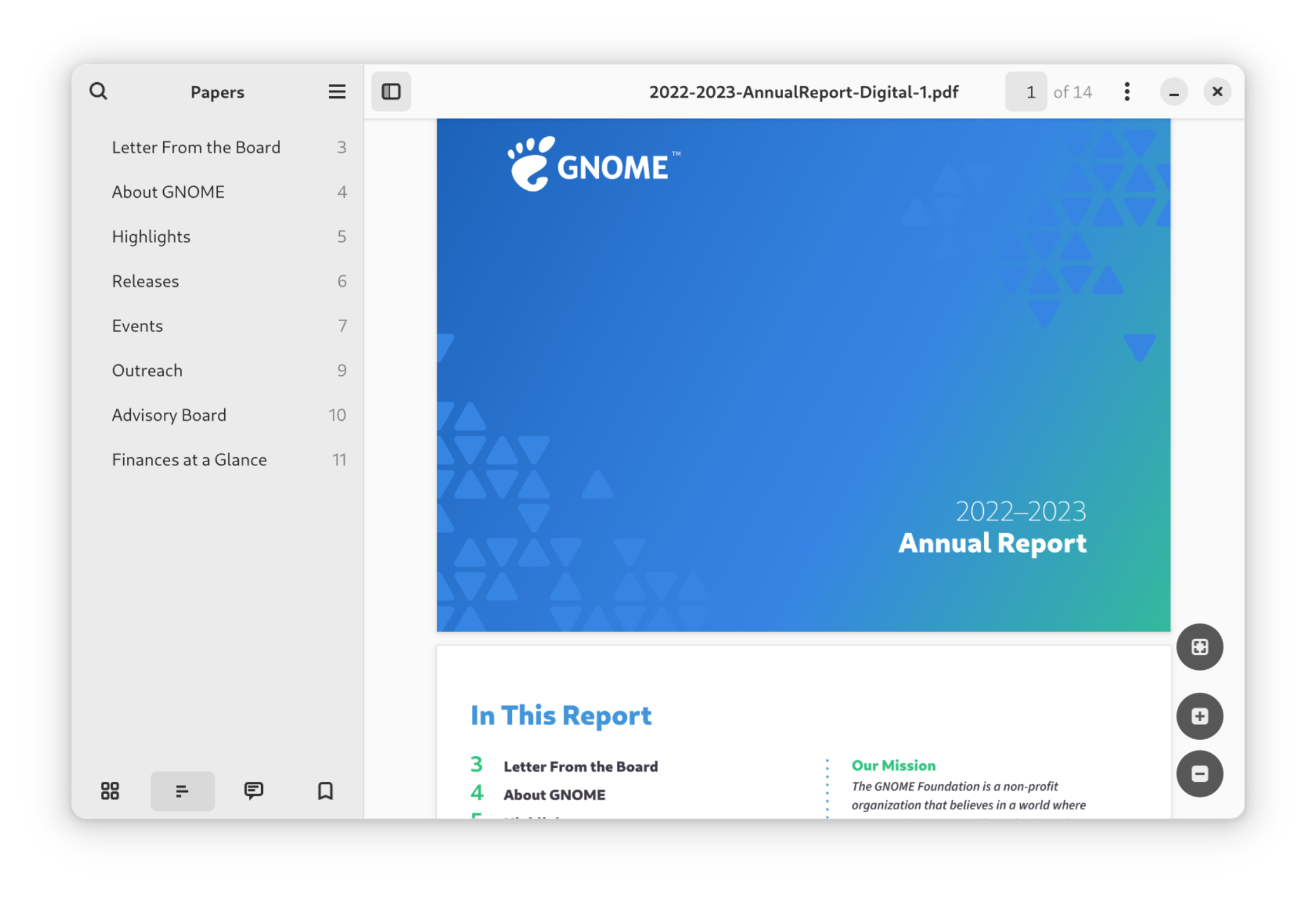
Document Viewer

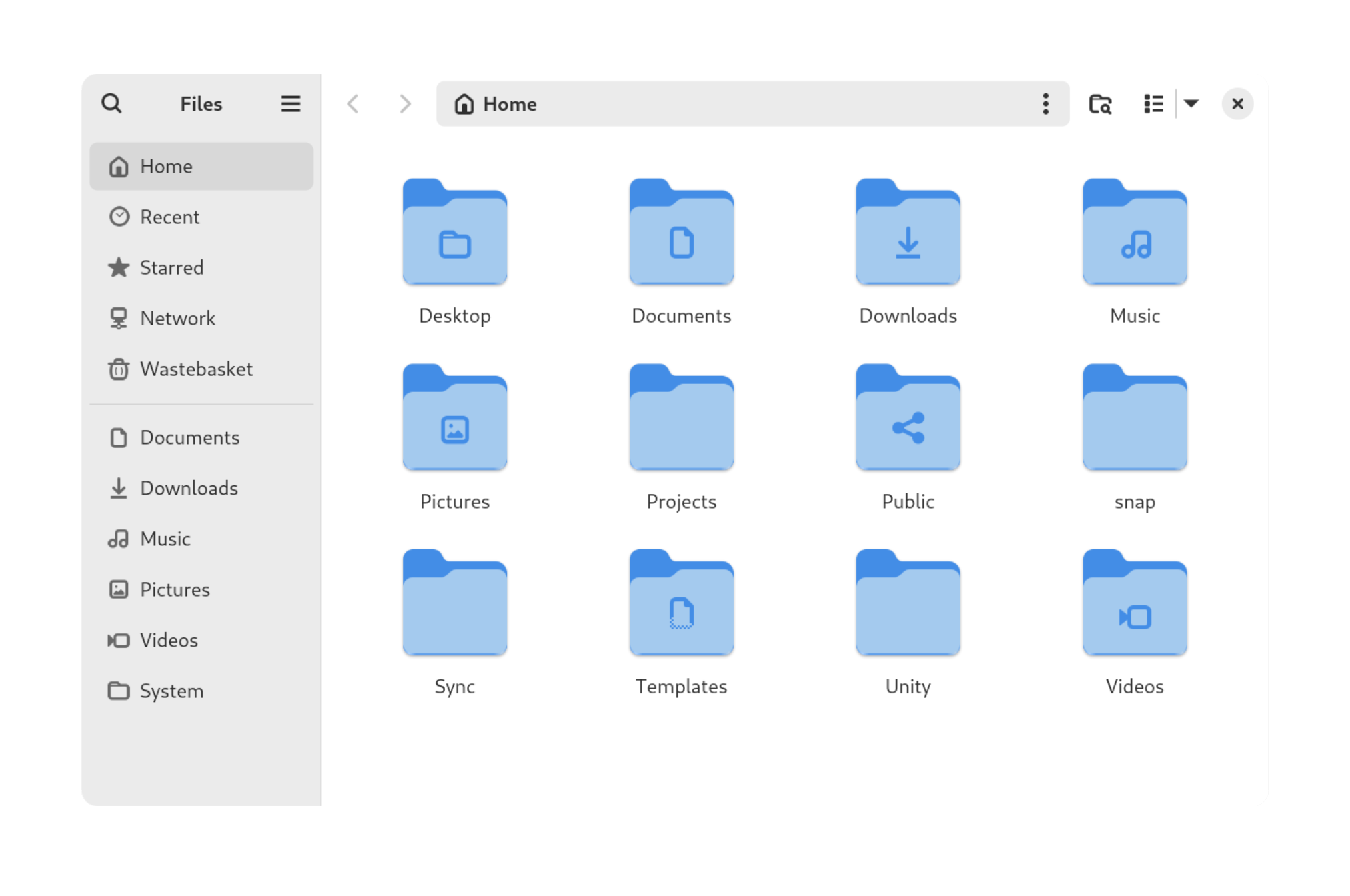
Files

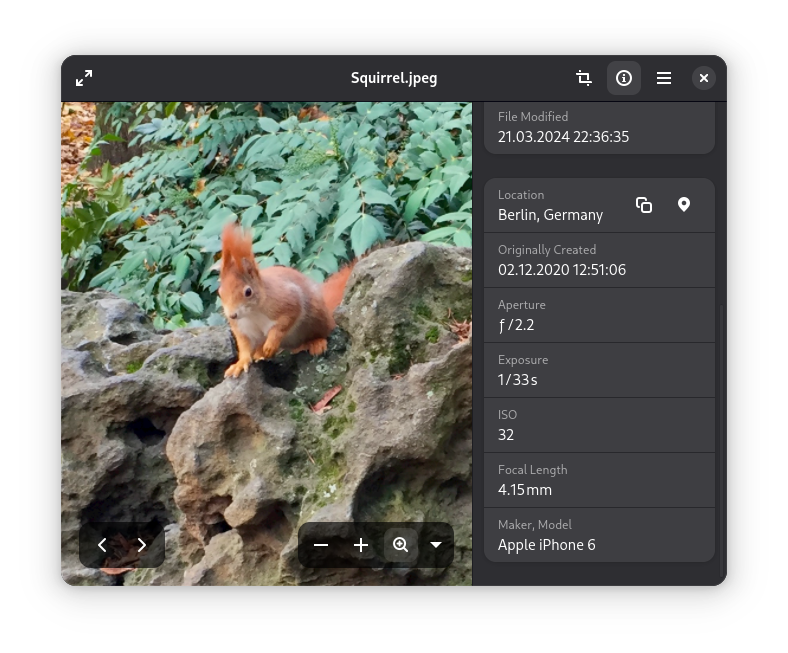
Image Viewer

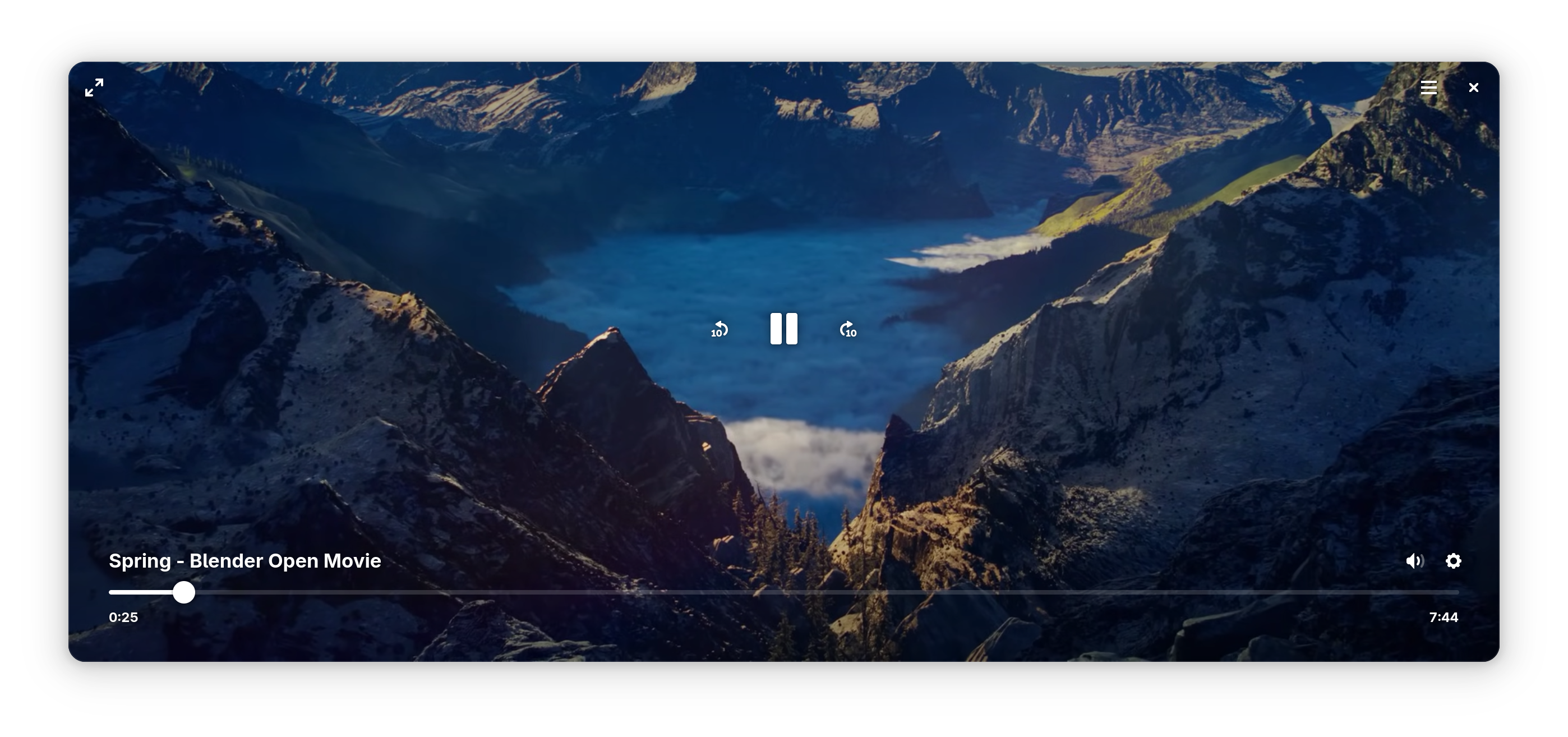
Video Player

== System ==
- Connections - the front-end for remote desktops. Introduced in GNOME 41.
- Disks - formatting and managing partitions
- Disk Usage Analyzer (Baobab) - Used for representing disk usage graphically
- Extensions - extension manager for the GNOME desktop
- Fonts - the font viewer
- Logs – written in Vala, introduced with 3.12
- Help (Yelp) - the help documentation software
- Software - the software manager, supports native package managers, as well as Flatpaks
- System Monitor - shows CPU usage graphs
- Terminal Emulators
  - Console (King's Cross)
  - Terminal
  - Ptyxis (replaced Terminal starting on Fedora 42 and Ubuntu 25.04)
- Web (Epiphany) - the web browser
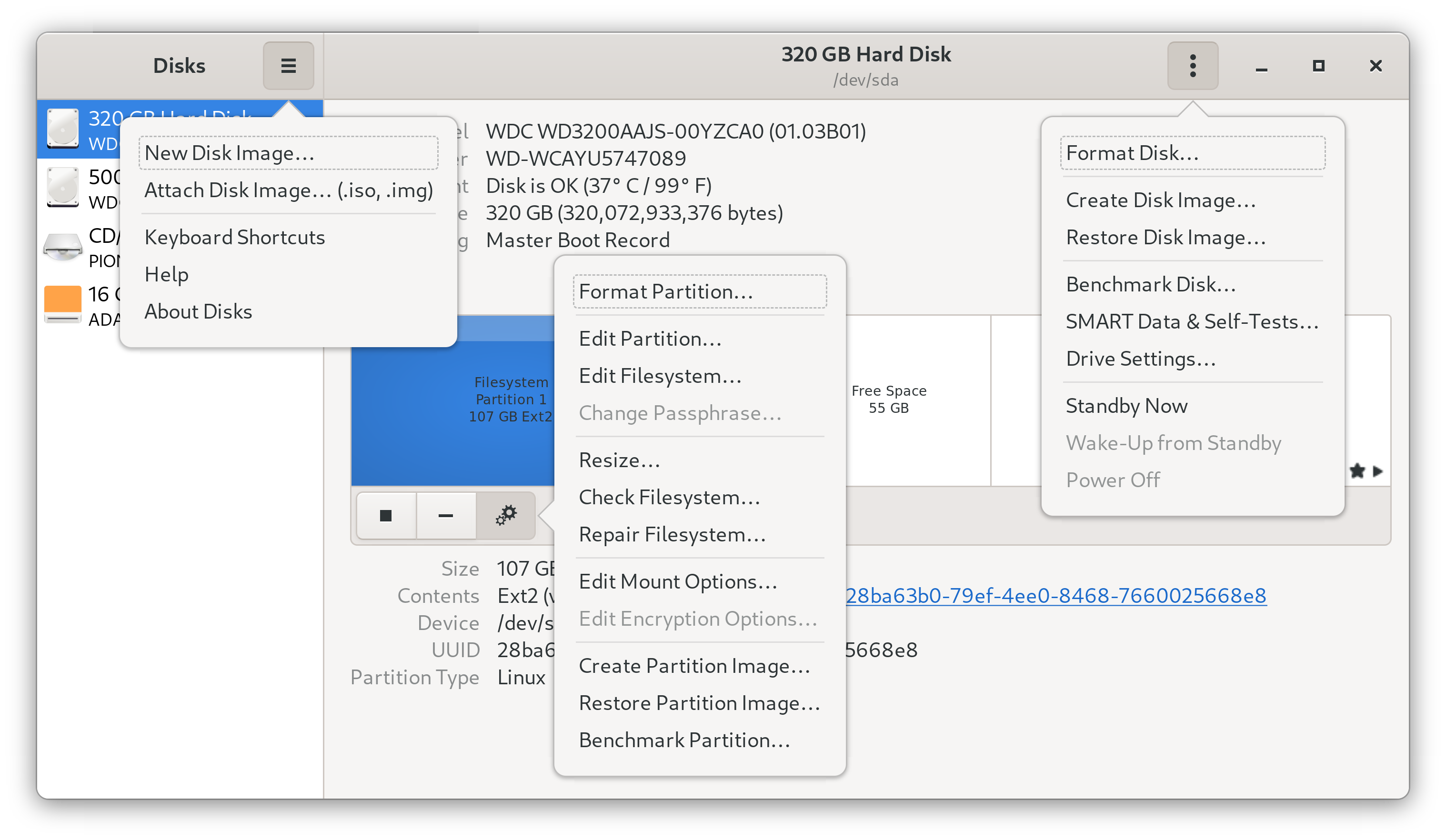
GNOME Disks

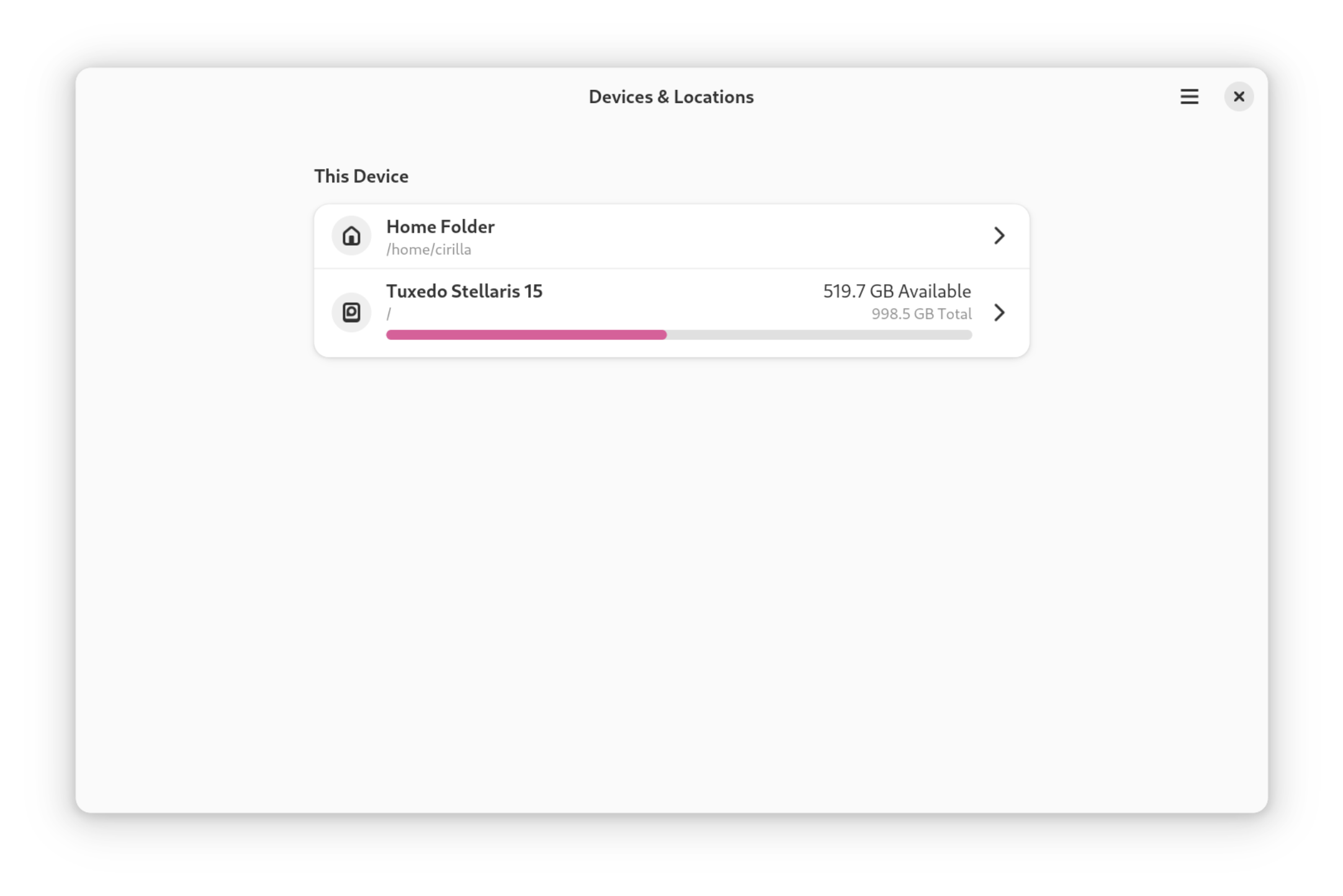
GNOME Usage Analyzer

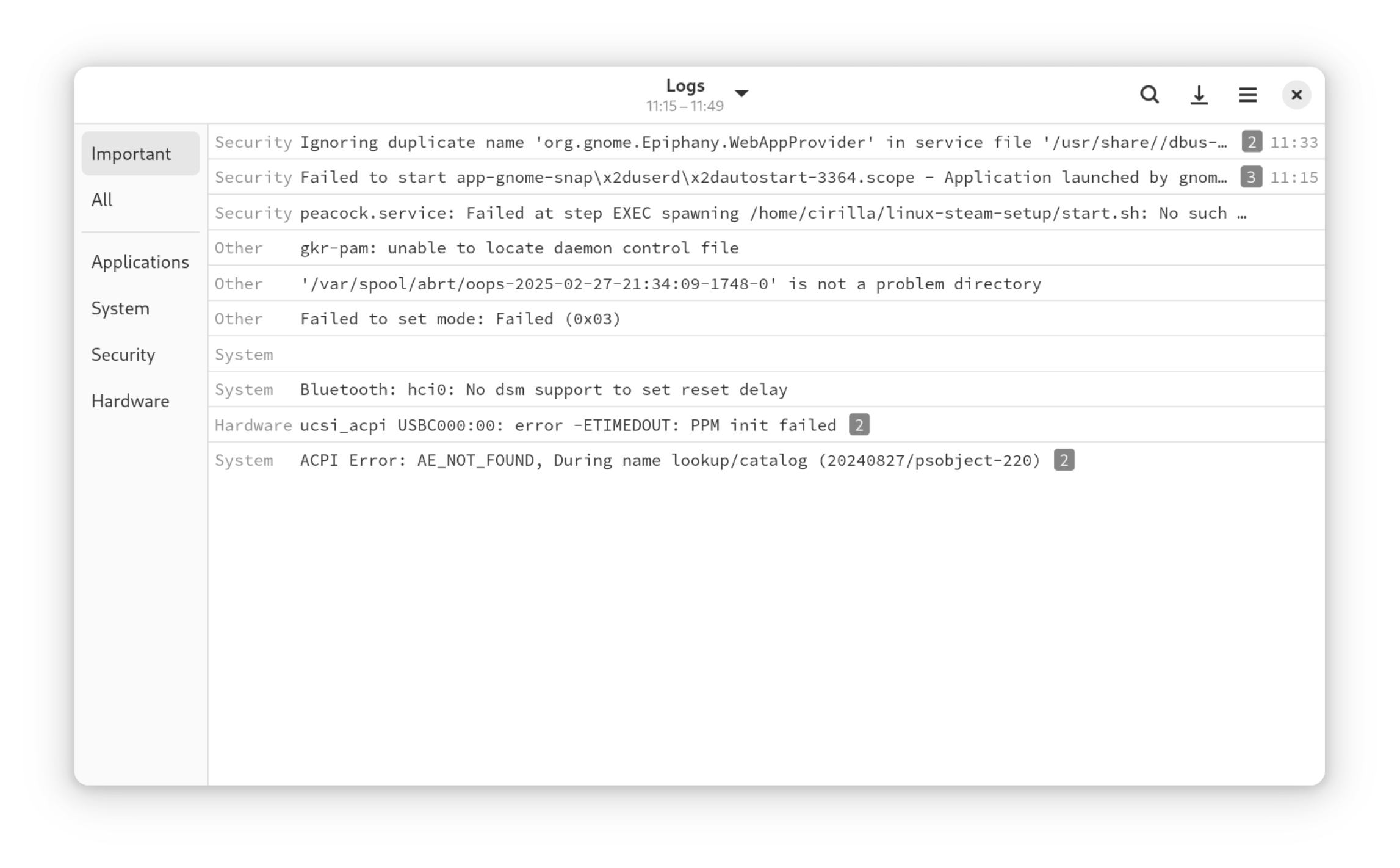
GNOME Logs

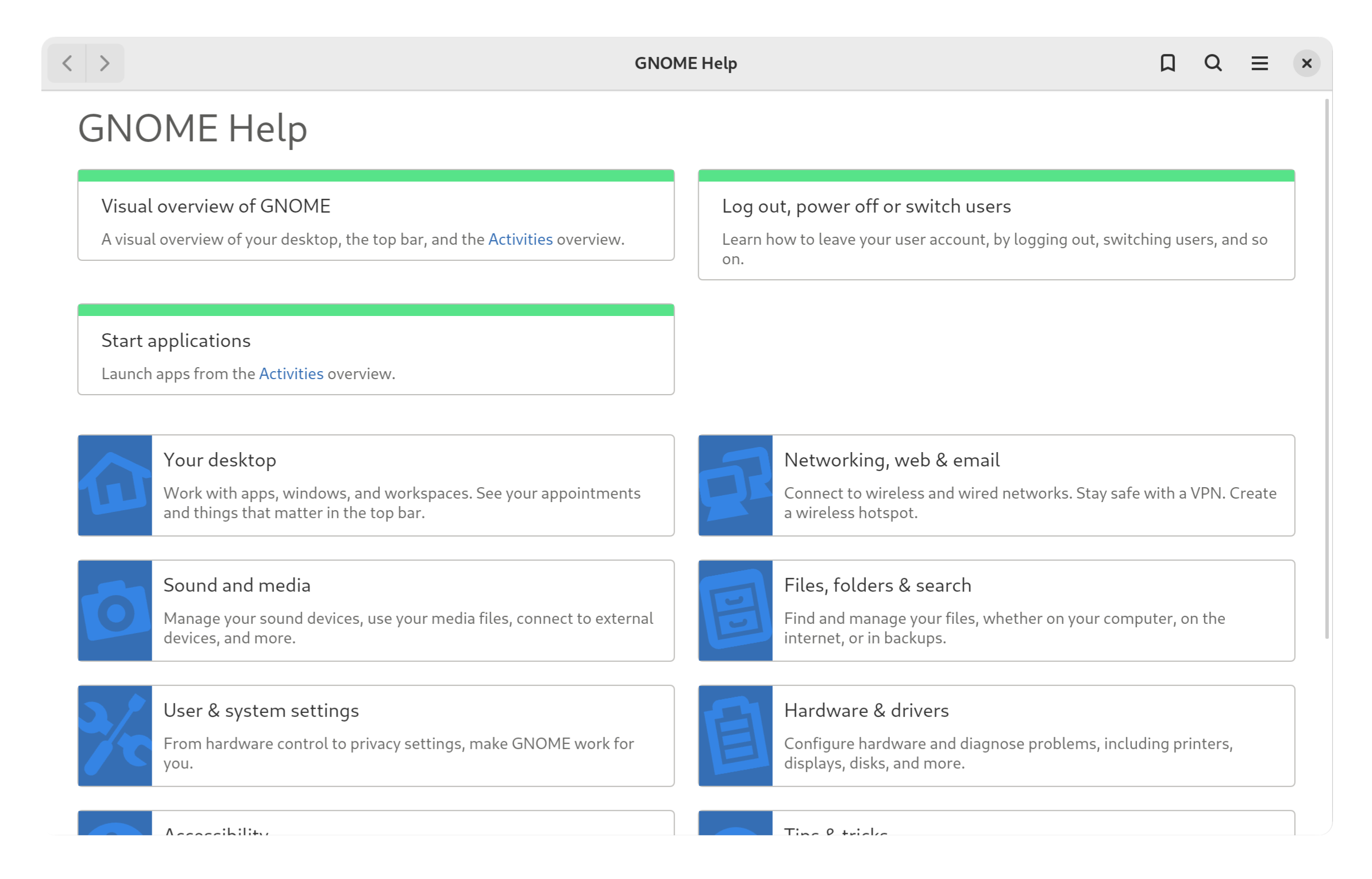
GNOME Help

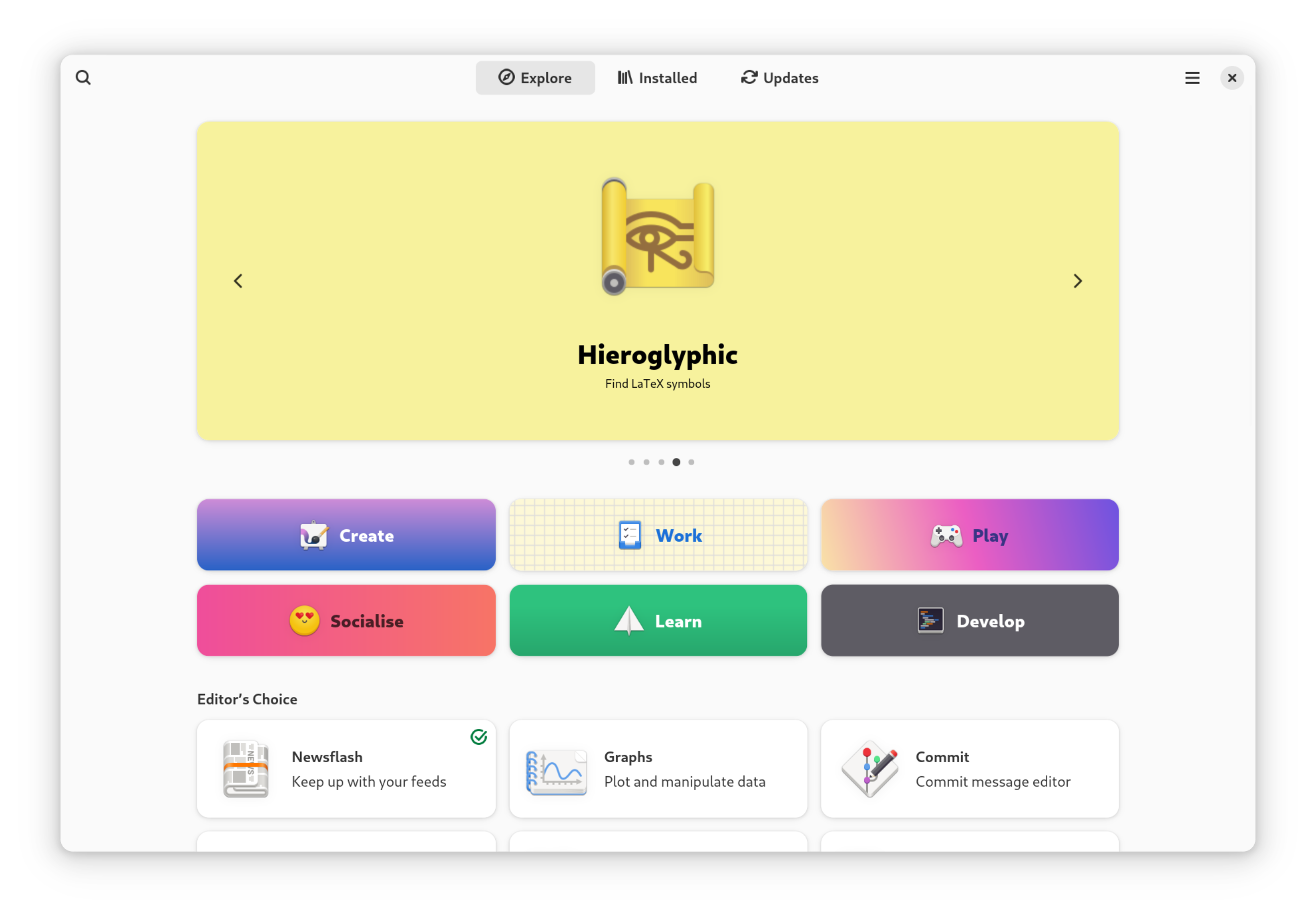
GNOME Software

== World ==
- GNOME Clocks - creating alarms and timers
- GNOME Maps - map application, powered by OpenStreetMap
- Weather - the weather app
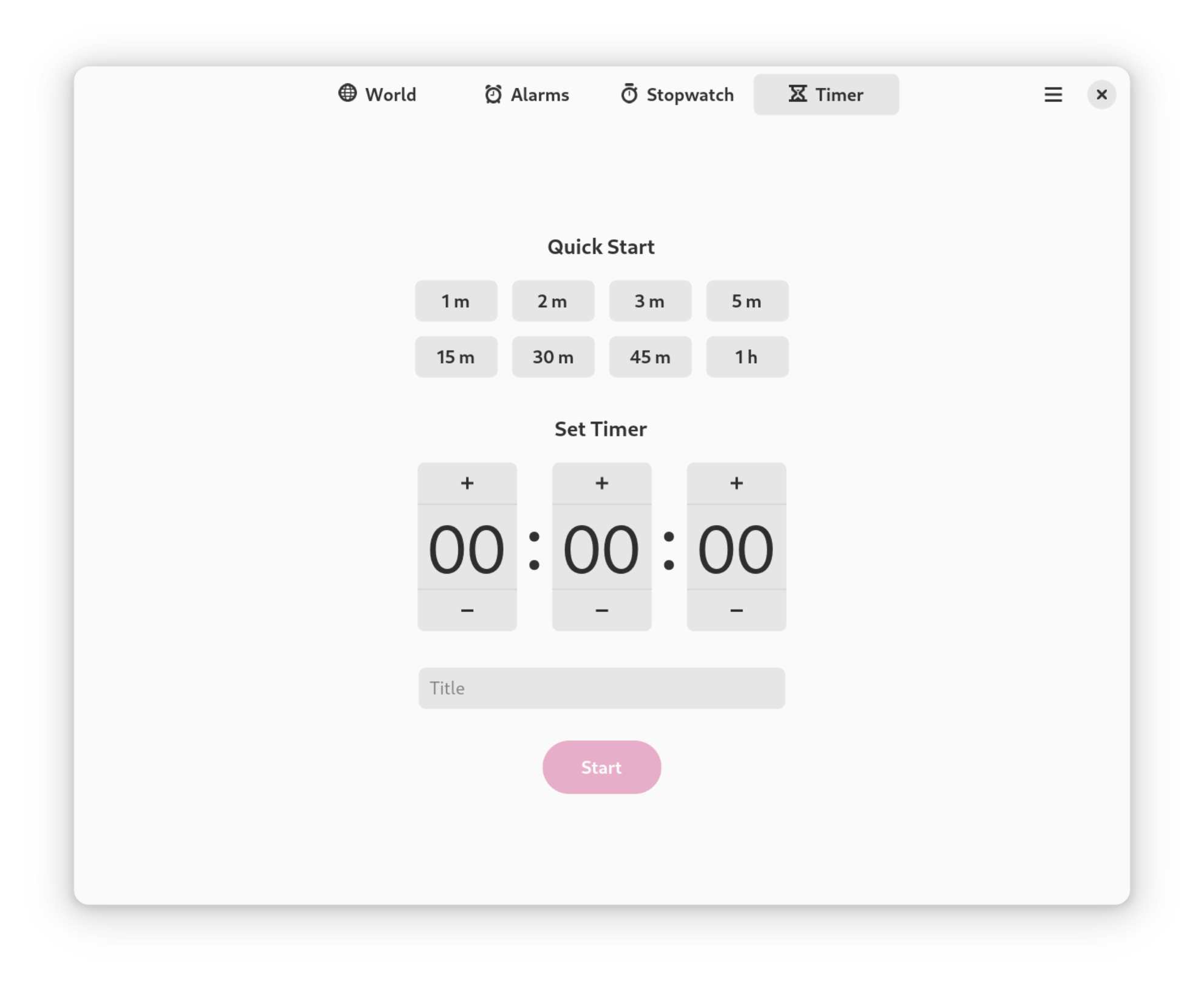
GNOME Clocks

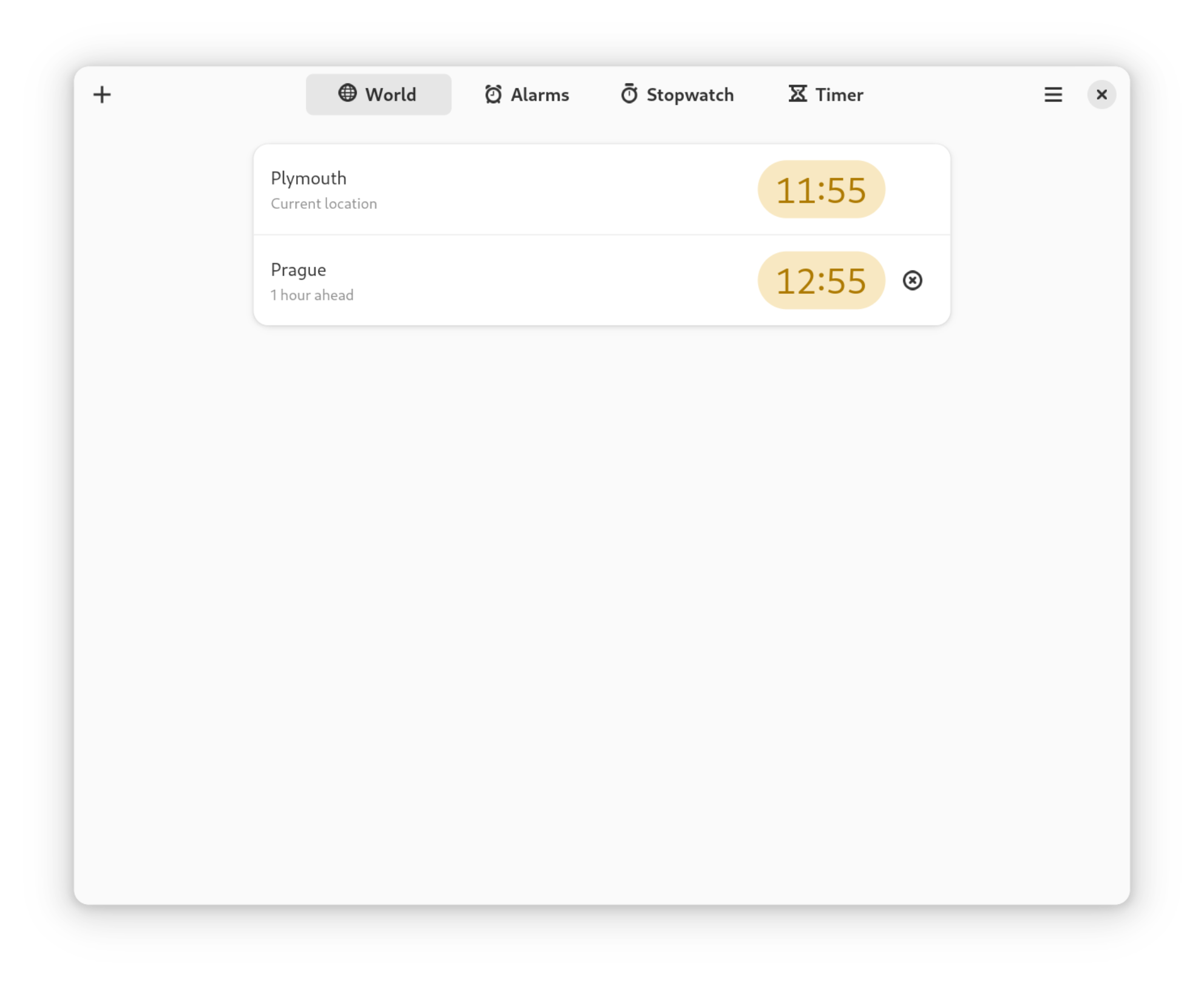
GNOME Clocks

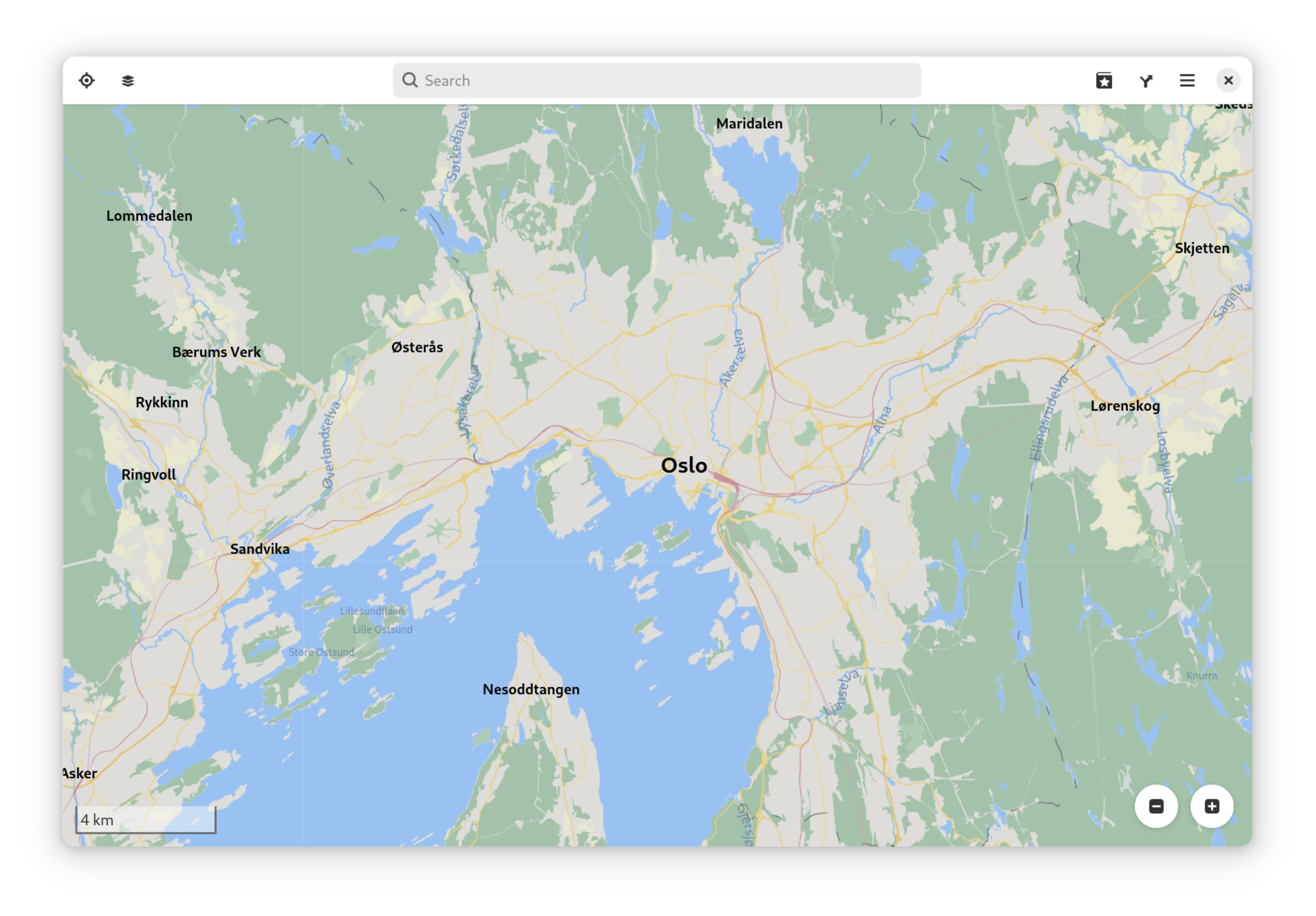
GNOME Maps

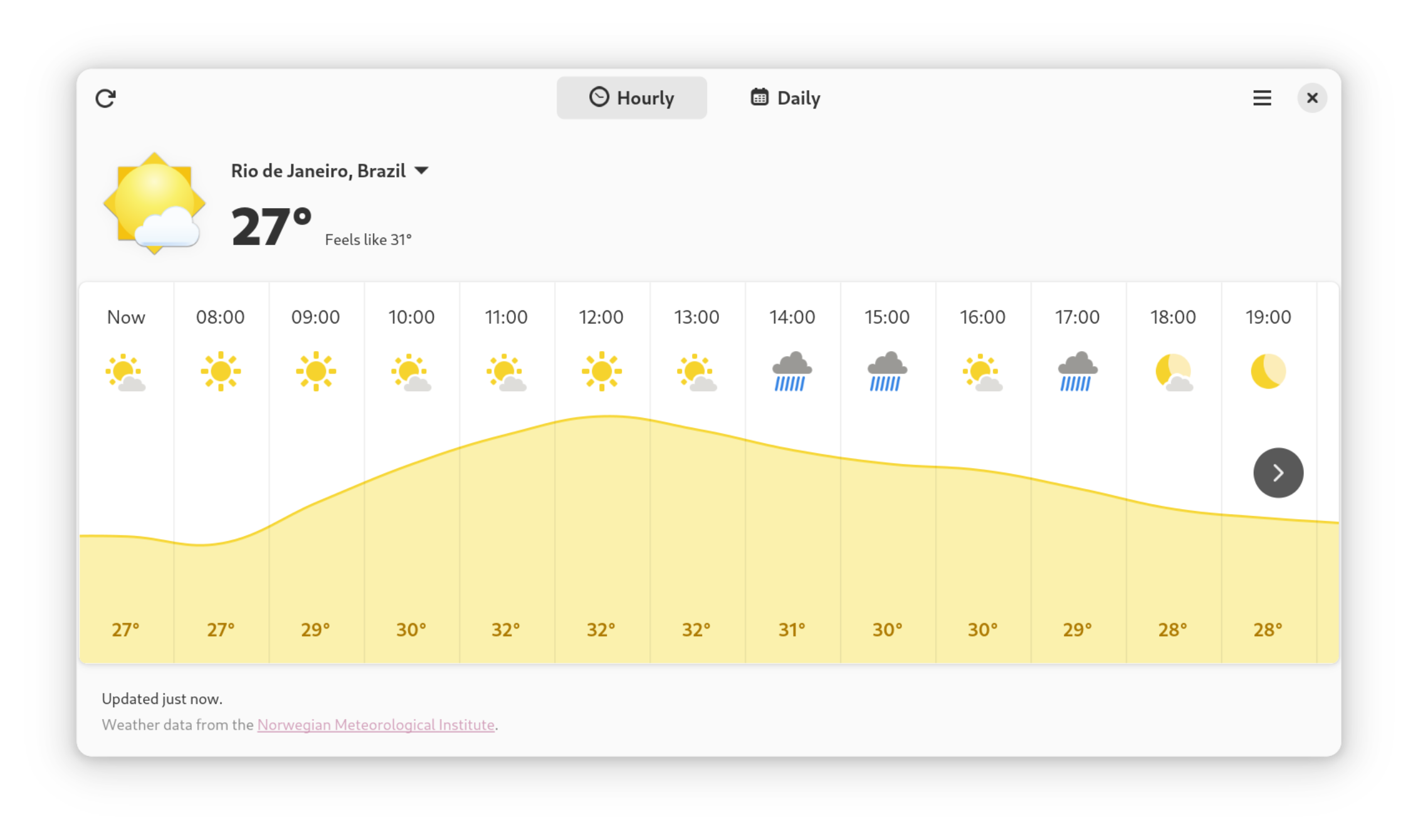
GNOME Weather

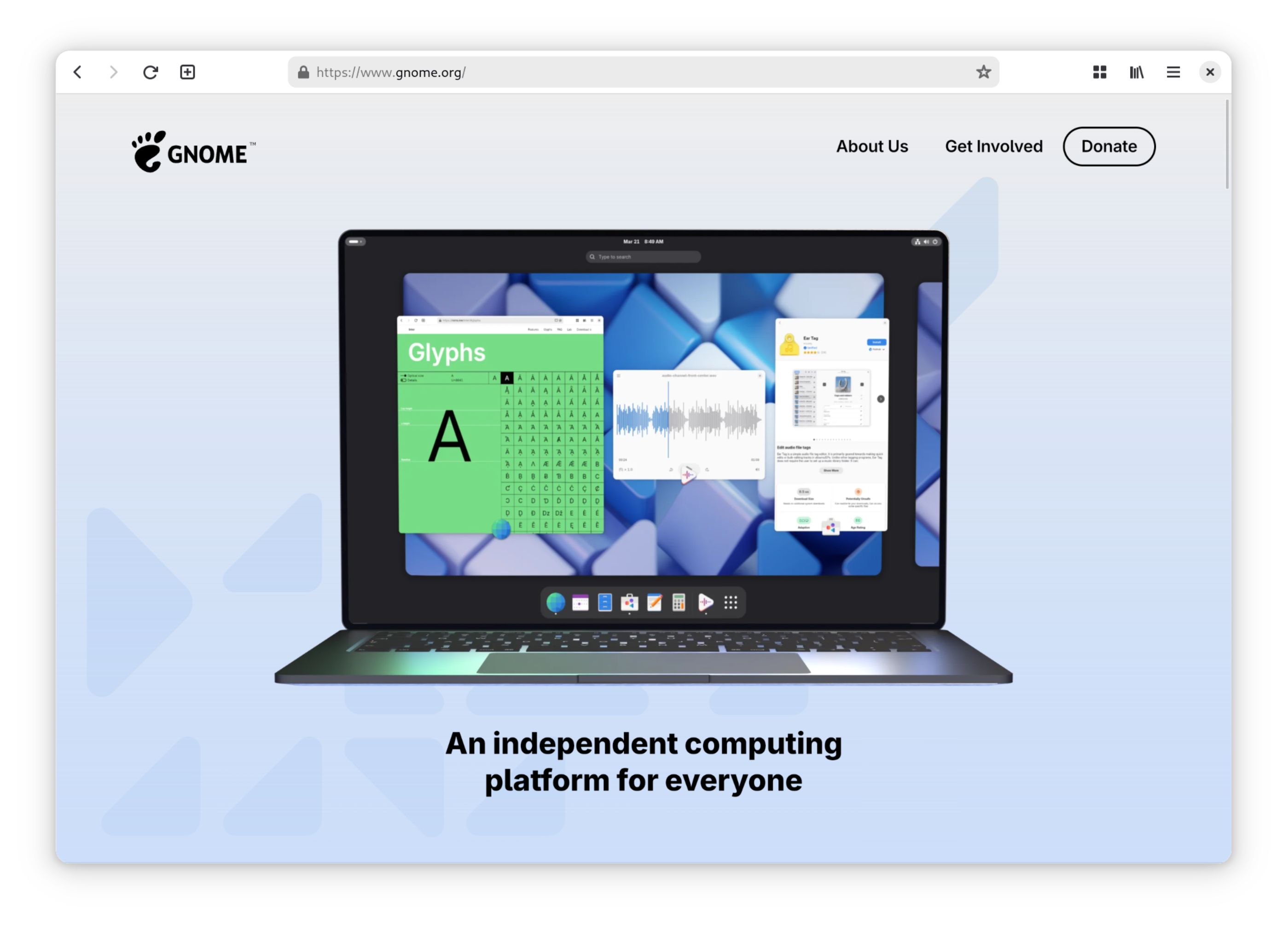
GNOME Web

== Utilities ==
- Calculator (gcalctool)
- Calendar
- Characters (Modern replacement for the previous core app: Gucharmap)
- Camera (Snapshot) (Modern replacement for the previous core app: Cheese)
- GNOME Tour
- GNOME Text Editor (Modern replacement for the previous core app: Gedit)
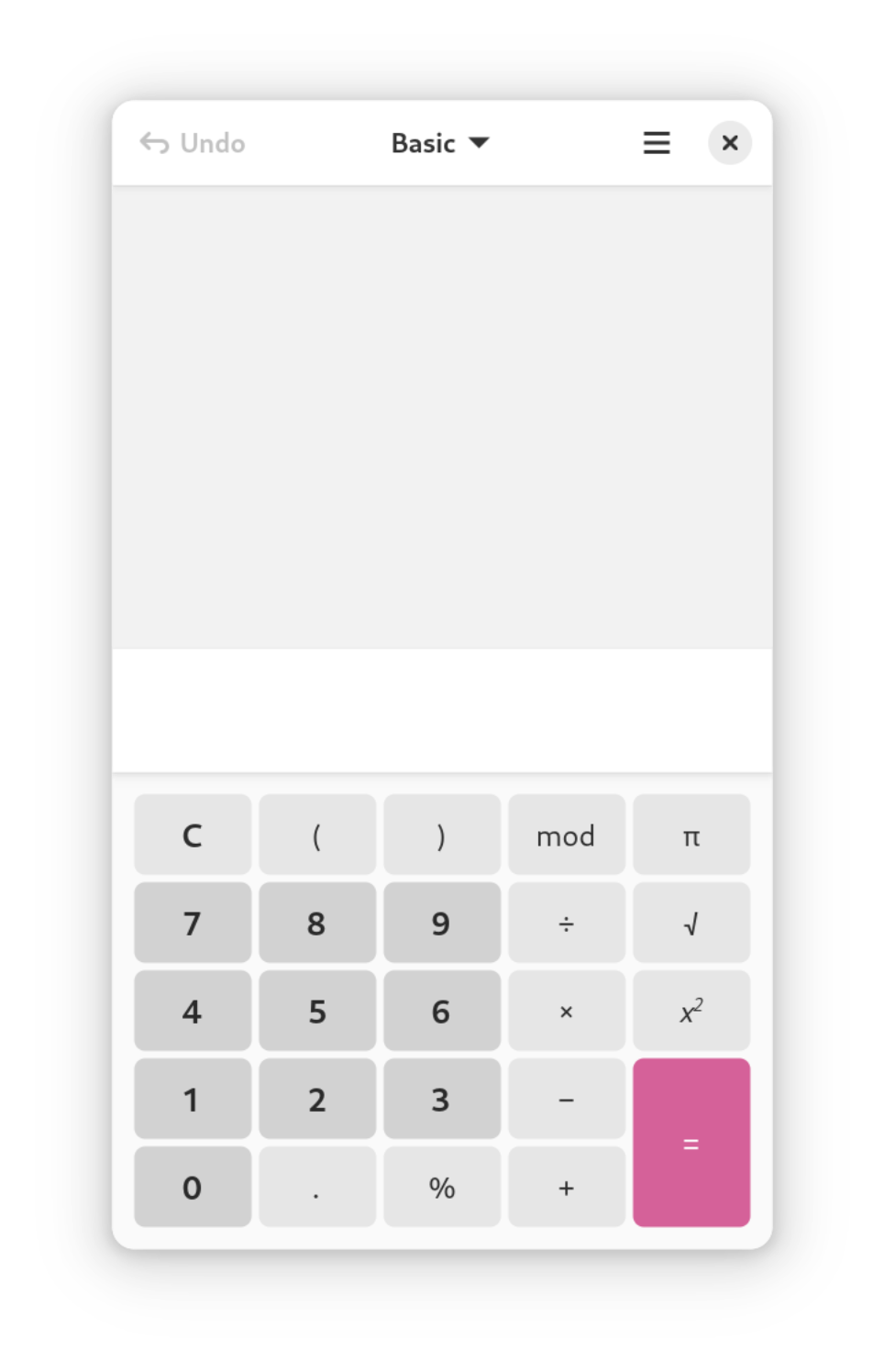
GNOME Calculator

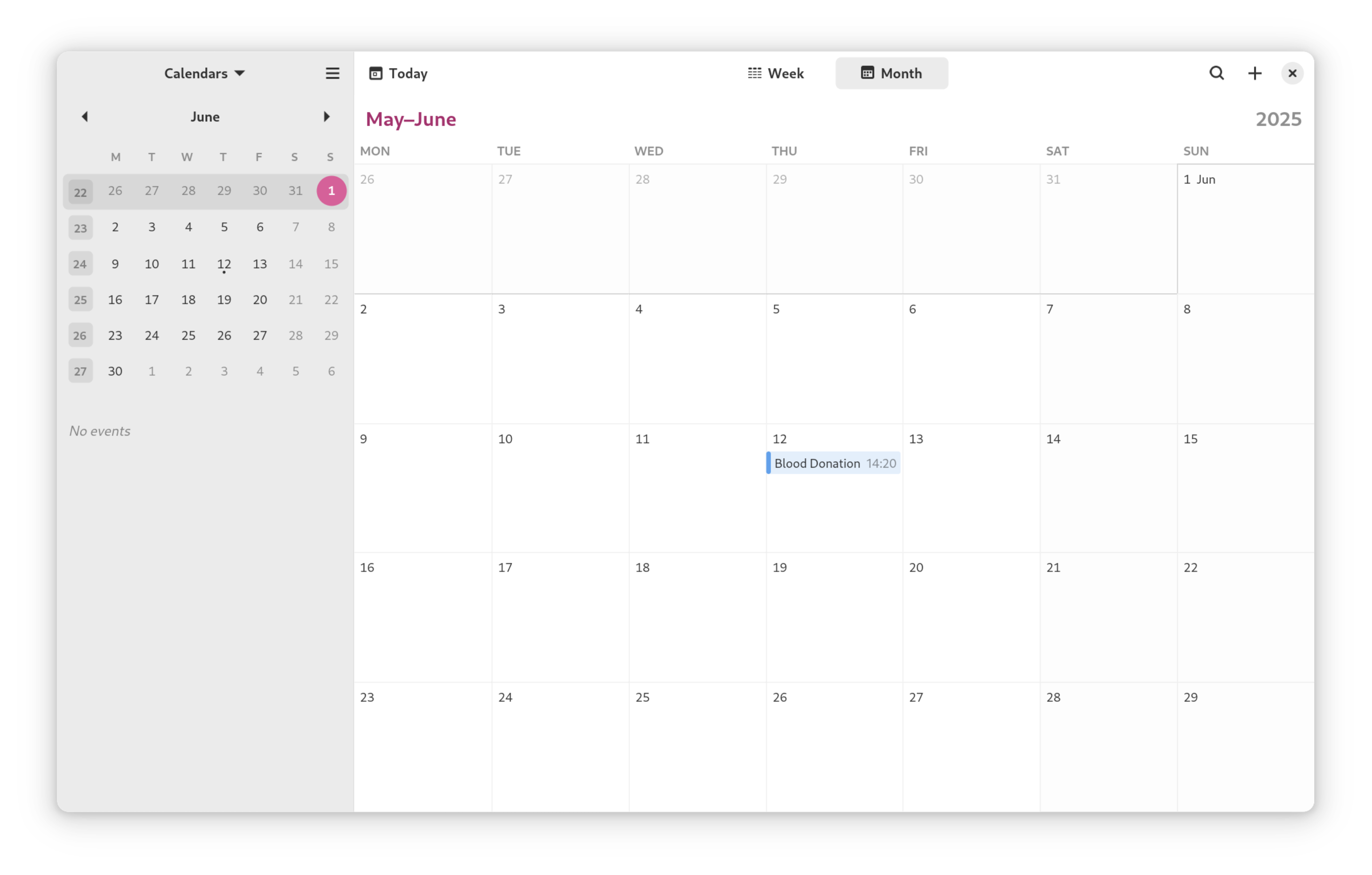
GNOME Calendar

== Development tools ==
- Boxes - the virtualization software
- Builder - the IDE for creating GNOME apps
- D-Spy - D-Bus analyzer
- Dconf Editor - Dconf database editor
- Devhelp - API documentation viewer
- Sysprof - debugging software

== GNOME Circle ==
GNOME Circle logo

GNOME Circle is a collection of applications which have been built to extend the GNOME platform, utilize GNOME technologies, and follow the GNOME human interface guidelines. Developers who are using the GNOME platform can apply for inclusion in GNOME Circle. Benefits include promotional support and eligibility for project contributors to become GNOME Foundation members. Circle applications are not part of GNOME Core Applications.

Some examples of such applications include:

- Apostrophe - a markdown editor
- Authenticator - a two-factor authentication code generator
- Eyedropper - a color picker and formatter utility
- Foliate - an ebook reader
- Fragments - a torrent manager
- Gaphor - a UML and SysML modeling tool
- Graphs - A graphical data-plotting application
- Health - a fitness tracker
- Pika Backup - a backup software
- Polari - a messaging app
- Wike (software) - a Wikipedia browser

== See also ==
- GNOME
- GNOME Project
- Adwaita (design language)
- Utility software
