= Apostrophe (text editor) =

Markdown text editor

- Developers: Wolf Vollprecht, Manuel Genovés
- Initial release: July 9, 2012; 13 years ago
- Stable release: 3.0 / 1 May 2024; 2 years ago
- Preview release: 2.2.0-beta1 / 17 April 2019; 7 years ago
- Written in: Python
- Operating system: Linux
- Size: ~4.6MB
- License: GPL 3.0
- Website: world.pages.gitlab.gnome.org/apostrophe/
- Repository: gitlab.gnome.org/World/apostrophe

Apostrophe (formerly known as UberWriter) is an open-source, minimalist Markdown text editor, developed by Wolf Vollprecht. It was originally created for the Ubuntu App Showdown, and has since received recognition as one of the Top 10 Ubuntu Apps of 2012.

== History ==
Wolf Vollprecht credited the Mac application iA Writer as being the inspiration for UberWriter, and has expressed his wish to see the two programs become compatible:

A lot of inspiration for UberWriter comes from iA Writer, which is (sadly) only available for Mac OS X users to this date. However, if you like UberWriter and own a Mac, please consider buying iA Writer as I do not want to do any harm to them.

I actually would really like to see the two programs being compatible, as iA Writer is also available for iPad and iPhone. As soon as Dropbox Support comes to UberWriter this might happen.

== Features ==
- Clean user interface
- A focus mode, which greys out all but the sentence you are actively working on
- Fullscreen mode
- Markdown syntax highlighting
- Live word and character counting
- Live preview mode
- Out-of-the-box math support
- Can export Markdown to OpenDocument (ODF), PDF, EPUB, Rich Text Format (RTF), HTML, LaTeX, and MediaWiki Markup
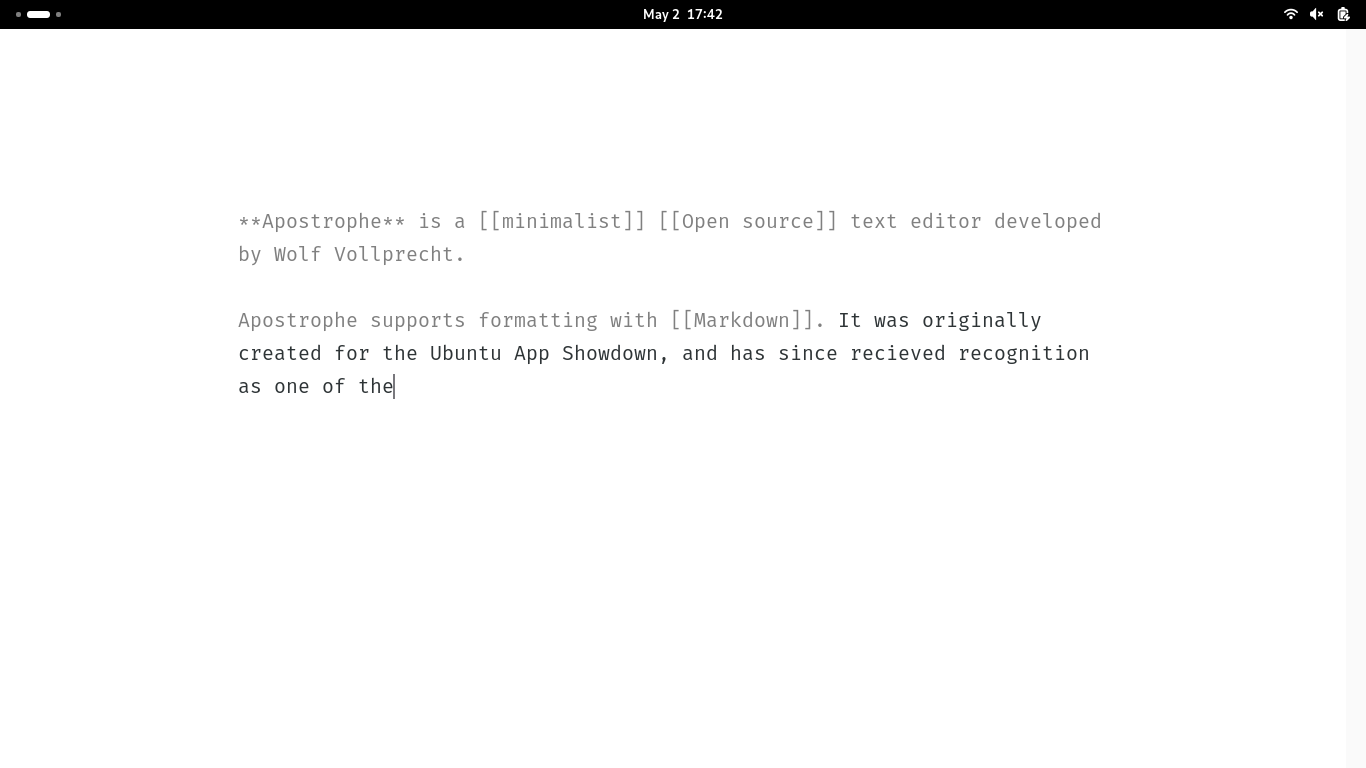
Focus mode in Apostrophe

== See also ==
- List of text editors
- Comparison of text editors
- iA Writer
