= Clearlooks =

Theme for GTK

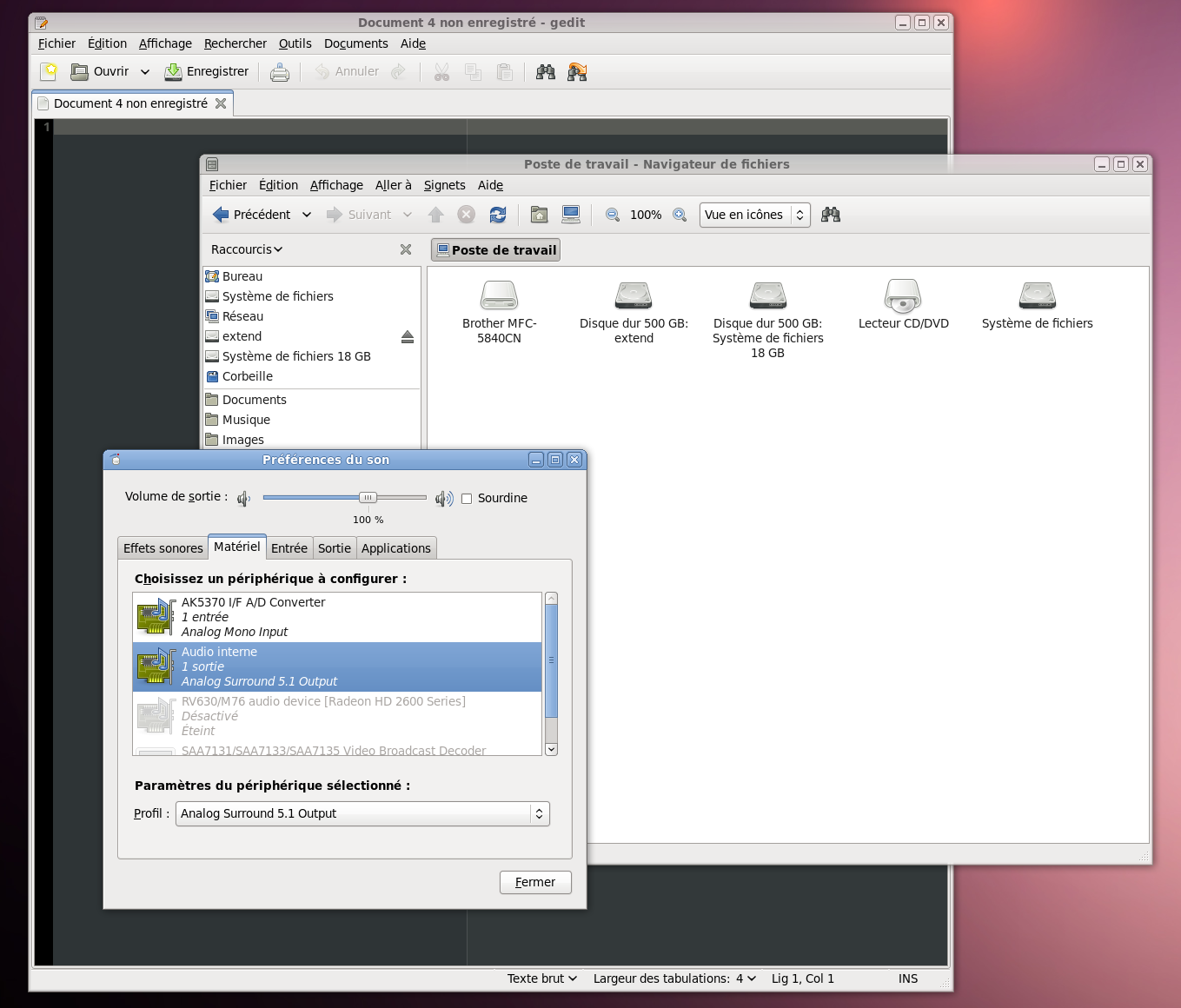
Sample of the Clearlooks 2.20 theme with various applications

Clearlooks is a theme for GTK, the main widget toolkit used by the GNOME desktop environment. It is based on Red Hat's Bluecurve theme. It was the default theme for GNOME since version 2.12 until GNOME 3 when it was replaced by Adwaita. Many users have contributed themes that have changed the colors and some visual effects, leading to many derivative themes.

The creators of the Clearlooks GTK+ theme were Richard Stellingwerff and Daniel Borgmann; however, since 2005 the theme has been developed by GNOME, and current developers are Andrea Cimitan and Benjamin Berg.

The current version of Clearlooks uses cairo as a backend. Older releases just use GDK to draw the widgets.

Qt, versions 4.2 to 4.4, use a port of Clearlooks called Cleanlooks to better integrate with GTK applications.

== GTK+ 3 Support ==
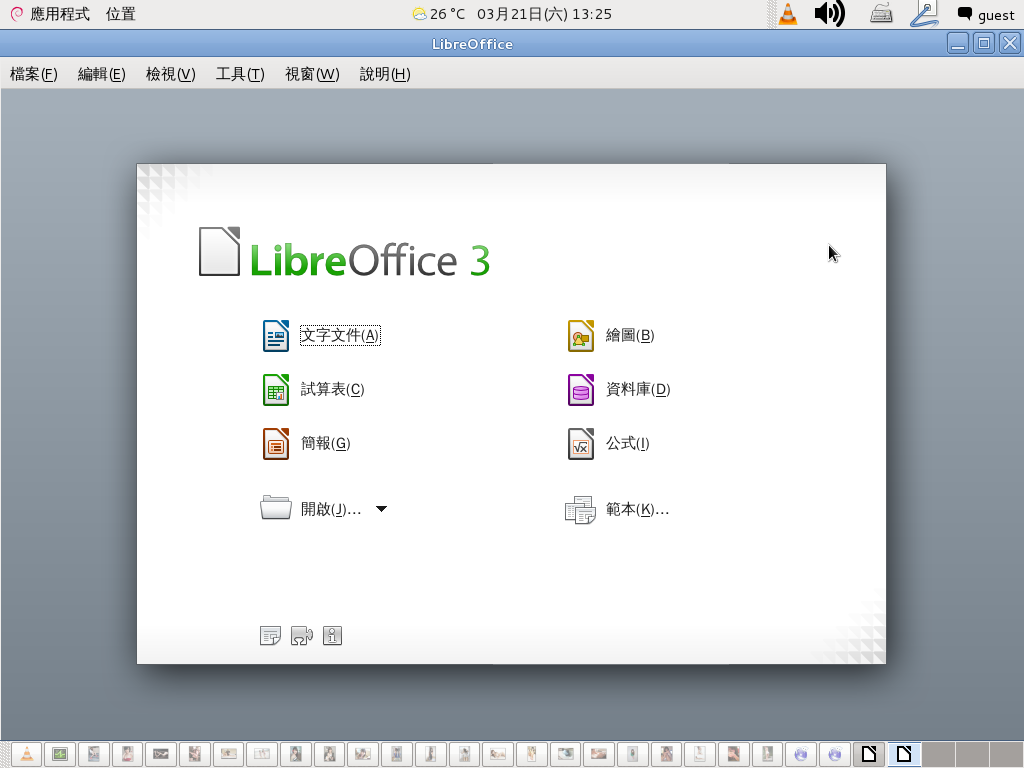
screenshot of LibreOffice 3.5.4.2 on Debian GNU/Linux 7.3 (wheezy) amd64 with GNOME 3.4.2 with theme Clearlooks-Phenix

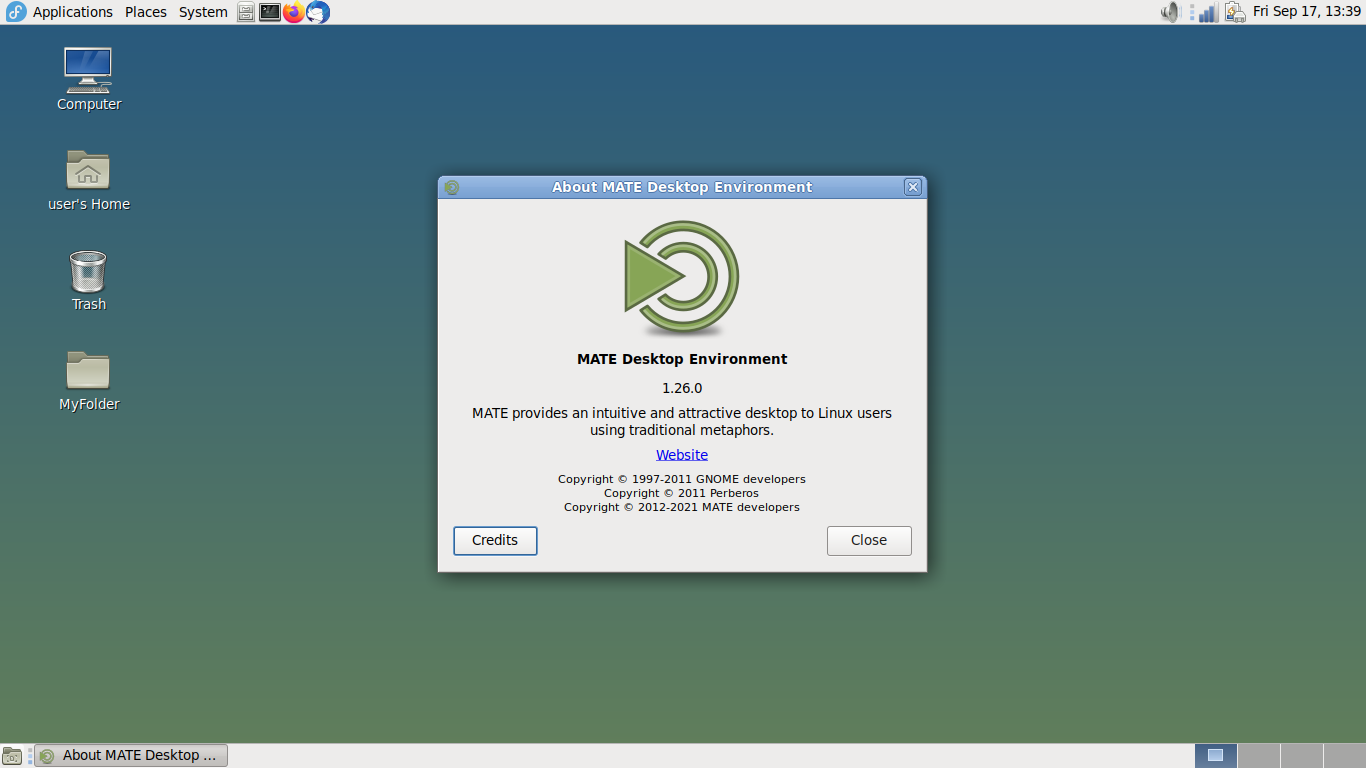
A typical MATE desktop environment with the Clearlooks fork TraditionalOK as a standard theme

Since the departure of the GNOME Project from the development of GNOME 2 and GTK+ 2, developers forked GNOME 2 and created the MATE desktop environment. It still contains almost all GNOME 2 features and themes. The Clearlooks theme is called TraditionalOK in MATE. Furthermore, a user by the name of jpfleury on Gnome-Look has recreated Clearlooks for GTK+ 3, called Clearlooks-Phenix.
