= GNOME Text Editor =

Text editor for Linux

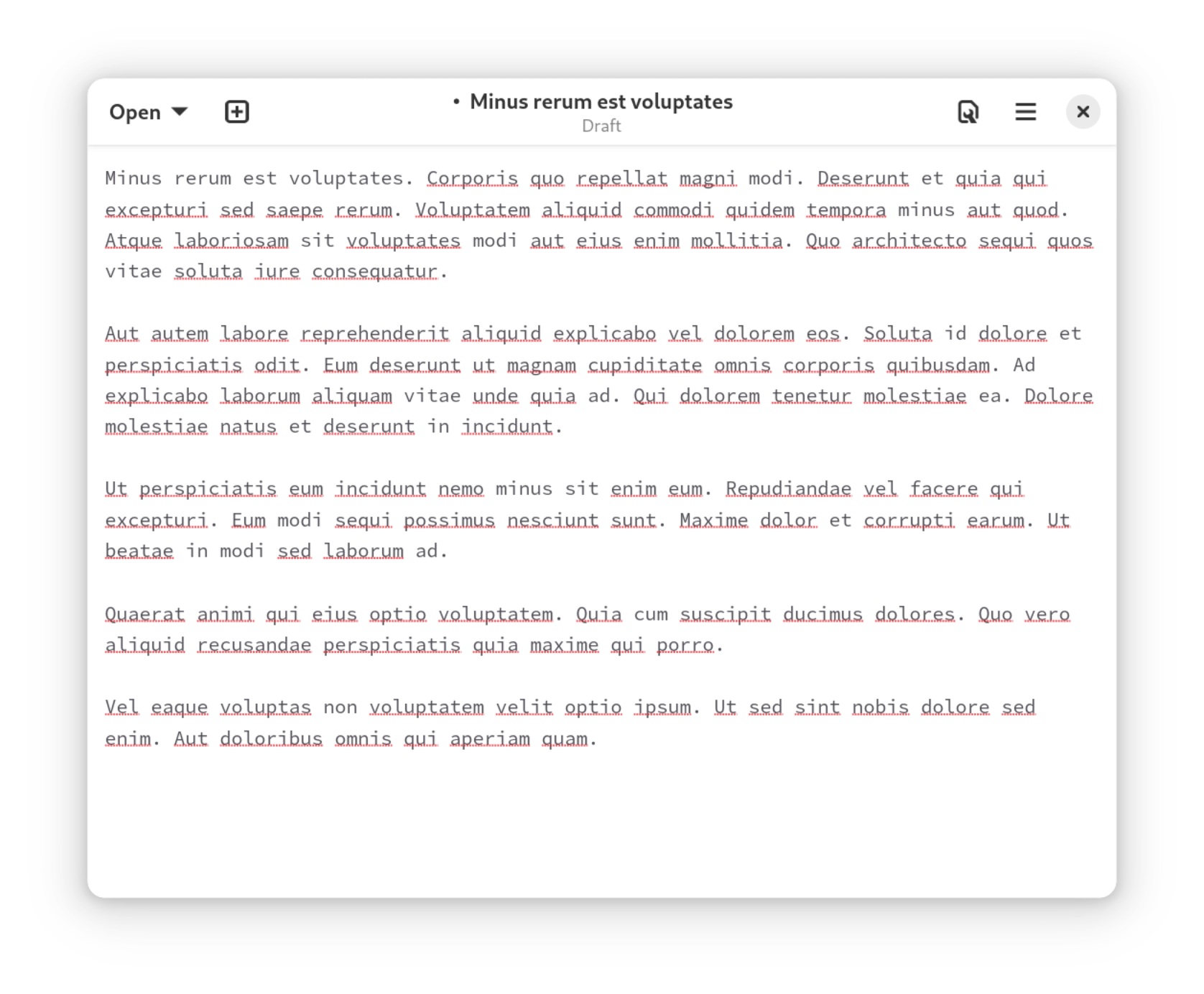
- Developer: Christian Hergert
- Stable release: 48.3 / 29 May 2025; 11 months ago
- Written in: Adwaita, GTK 4
- Operating system: Linux
- Type: Text editor
- License: GPL Version 3
- Website: apps.gnome.org/TextEditor/
- Repository: gitlab.gnome.org/GNOME/gnome-text-editor/

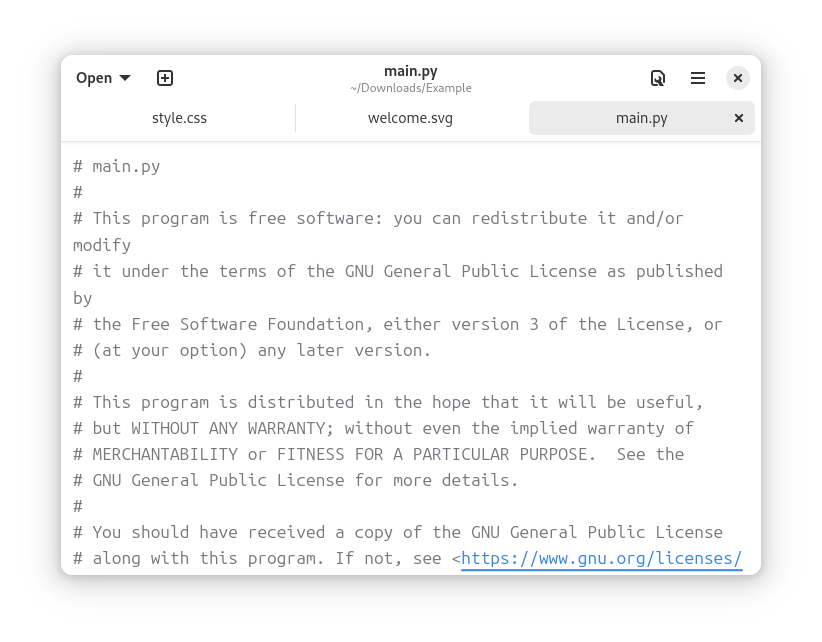
Tabs in GNOME Text Editor

GNOME Text Editor is the default text editor for the GNOME desktop environment. The program is a free and open-source graphical text editor included as part of the GNOME Core Applications. GNOME Text Editor has been the default text editor for GNOME since GNOME version 42, which was released in March 2022. GNOME Text Editor replaces gedit as GNOME's default text editor, and was created due to the GNOME developers' intention of having all of their programs comply with the GNOME Human interface guidelines (HIG). The adherence to their HIG is done by using the libadwaita library, and making gedit compliant with that would have required an extensive rewrite of gedit's code, so a new program was written from scratch instead.

GNOME Text Editor was created by GNOME Builder's creator Christian Hergert. The program was officially announced in March 2021 via a blog post by Hergert. The text editor is built using the Adwaita design language and GTK 4. The text editor has features including themes, dark mode, session restoration, autosave, the ability to zoom into text without changing the text's size, custom font support, and opening files can be done via a popover box.

Ubuntu replaced gedit, the text editor that had been Ubuntu's default text editor since 2004, with GNOME Text Editor in Ubuntu 22.10, citing Text Editor's adherence to desktop standards like dark mode and other GNOME design standards. Linux distributions that use GNOME 42 have also replaced gedit with GNOME Text Editor, including Fedora 36.
