= Yelp (disambiguation) =

Yelp is an Internet search and review service.

Yelp may also refer to:

- Yelp (sound), a vocalization made by canines, humans, and other animals
- Yelp (software), the help-reading application in the GNOME desktop environment
- yelp, a type of sound that can be made by an alarm or emergency vehicle siren
