= Yelp (software) =

Help documentation viewer for GNOME

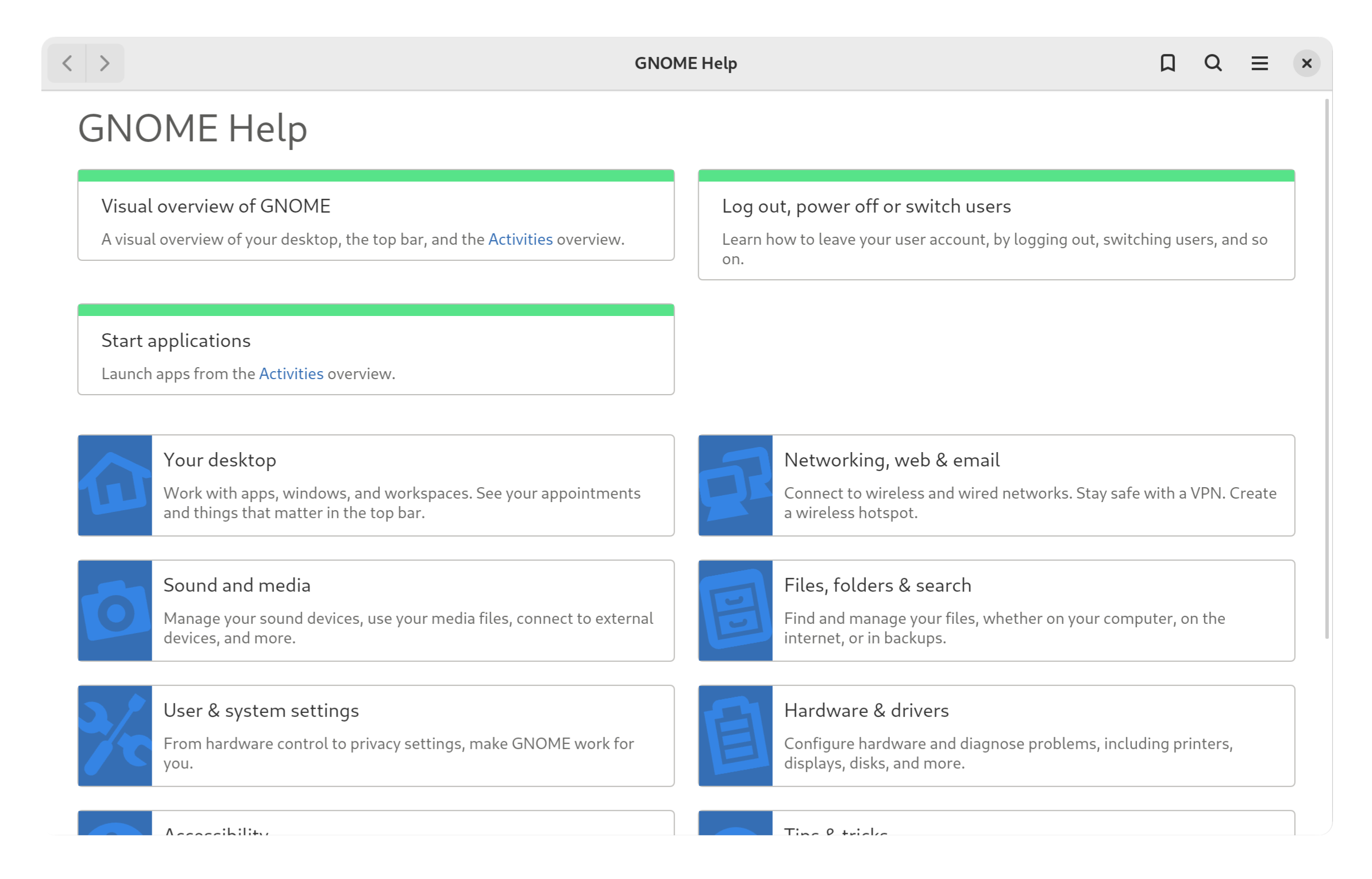
- Original authors: Mikael Hallendal and Alexander Larsson
- Release: October 27, 2001; 24 years ago
- Stable release: 49.2 / 10 August 2026; 2 months ago
- License: GPLv2
- Website: wiki.gnome.org/Apps/Yelp
- Repository: gitlab.gnome.org/GNOME/yelp

Yelp, also known as the GNOME Help Browser, is the default help viewer for GNOME that allows users to access help documentation. Yelp follows the freedesktop.org help system specification and reads mallard, DocBook, man pages, info, and HTML documents. HTML is available by using XSLT to render XML documents into HTML.

Yelp has a search feature as well as a toolbar at the top for navigation through previously viewed documentation.

Yelp can be accessed by typing yelp either into GNOME Shell, after pressing Alt+F2 within GNOME, or within a terminal using the yelp [file] format. The command gnome-help can also be used to access Yelp.

Although Yelp is not required for GNOME to function, it is required to view GNOME's help documentation. Ubuntu also uses yelp to provide a customized help interface for its software.

A format string vulnerability in GNOME versions 2.19.90 and 2.24 allowed arbitrary code execution through Yelp.
