= GNOME Devhelp =

API documentation browser for GNOME

Devhelp

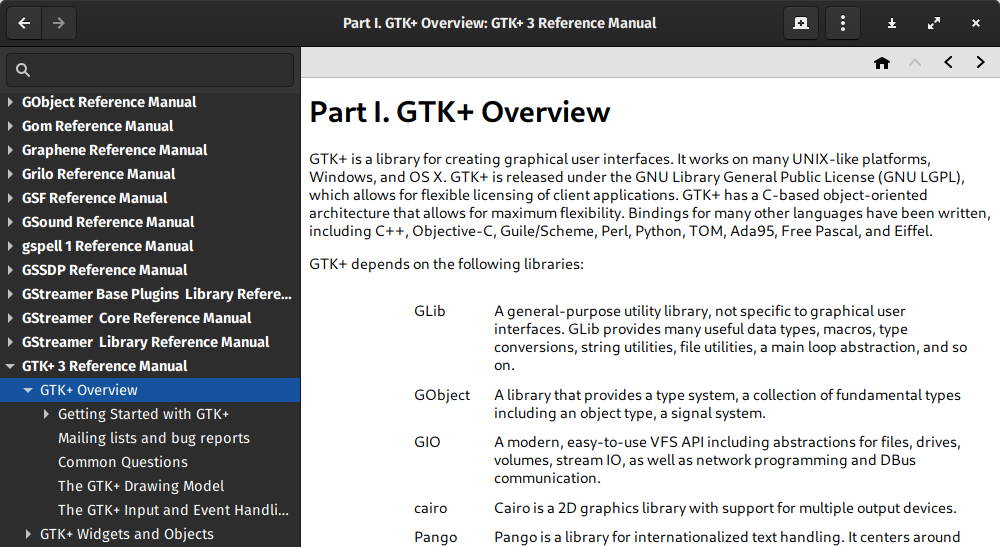
- Devhelp 3.32
- Original author: Johan Dahlin
- Developer: Frederic Peters
- Release: 31 July 2001; 25 years ago
- Stable release: 41.1 / 17 September 2021; 4 years ago
- Preview release: 41.rc / 4 September 2021; 4 years ago
- Operating system: Linux, Unix-like, OS X
- Type: Help browser
- License: GNU General Public License
- Website: apps.gnome.org/Devhelp/
- Repository: gitlab.gnome.org/GNOME/devhelp.git

Devhelp is a GTK/GNOME browser for API documentation; it works natively with gtk-doc (which is the API reference format for GTK/GNOME documentation).

It is integrated in GNOME development tools such as GNOME Builder, Glade and Anjuta, and is an official application of the GNOME project. Devhelp uses Bonobo for integration to Emacs via command line searches and is embedded in other development applications such as Anjuta.

Devhelp uses the GTK port of WebKit for HTML rendering of documentation; versions prior to 0.22 used Gecko, a layout engine developed by Mozilla Corporation and used in the Firefox web browser.
