= Mallard (documentation) =

- Filename extension: .page
- Developed by: Shaun McCance
- Type of format: markup language
- Extended from: XML
- Standard: Mallard 1.1
- Website: projectmallard.org

Mallard is a markup language for the creation of help pages and user documentation for applications (technical documentation). Mallard 1.0 was released on 23 July 2013.

Mallard is an XML language. Similar to DocBook, it defines the logical structure of a document. The documents are then displayed in a help browser, which creates links between the documents. Concepts such as guides and topics provide means for reaching help pages in different ways.

At the moment, GNOME applications such as Web, Eye of GNOME, Evince and others use Mallard for documentation purposes. Mallard is the preferred system for the GNOME Documentation.

Mallard pages can be viewed in Yelp, a GNOME help browser. Further output formats are planned that can be generated via the command line using the tools that are provided via Gitorious:

- HTML
- LaTeX
- Dot
