= Eye of GNOME =

Free image viewer software for the GNOME desktop environment

Eye of GNOME (Image Viewer)

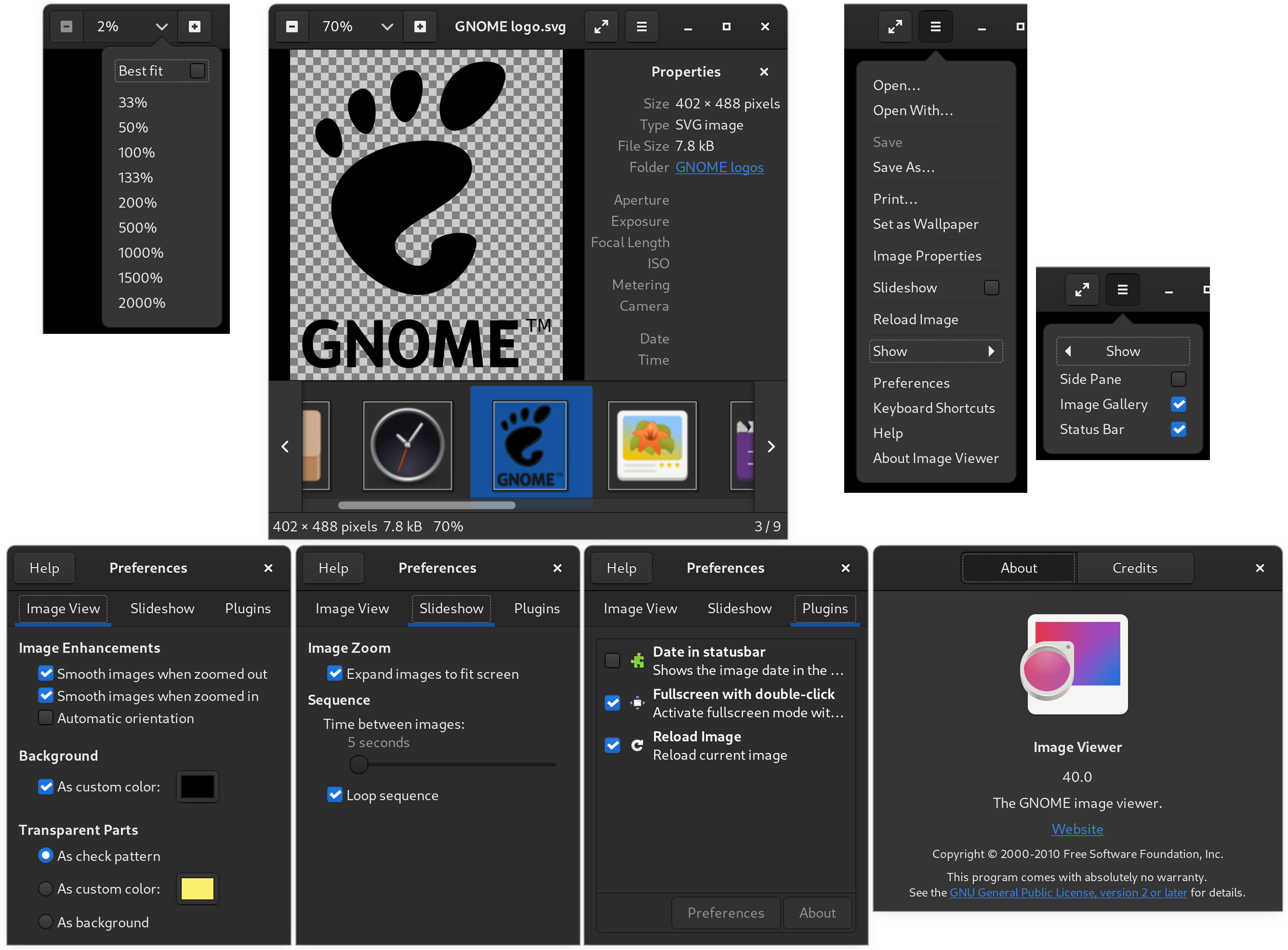
- Eye of GNOME 40 (released in 2021–03)
- Developer: The GNOME Project
- Stable release: 47.0 / 7 September 2024; 23 months ago
- Written in: C (GTK)
- Operating system: Unix-like
- Platform: GNOME
- Successor: GNOME Loupe
- Type: Image viewer
- License: GPL-2.0-or-later
- Website: wiki.gnome.org/Apps/EyeOfGnome
- Repository: gitlab.gnome.org/GNOME/eog.git

Eye of GNOME is the former default image viewer for the GNOME desktop environment, where it had also been known as Image Viewer. It has been superseded by Loupe in GNOME 45. There is also another official image viewer for GNOME called gThumb that has more advanced features like image organizing and image editing functions.

Eye of GNOME provides basic effects for improved viewing, such as zooming, full-screen, rotation, and transparent image background control. It also has many official plug-ins to extend its features or change its behavior.

== File formats ==
Eye of GNOME supports the following file formats:

- ANI – Animation
- AVIF AV1 Image File Format
- BMP – Windows Bitmap
- GIF – Graphics Interchange Format
- ICO – Windows Icon
- JPEG – Joint Photographic Experts Group
- PCX – PC Paintbrush
- PNG – Portable Network Graphics
- PNM – Portable Anymap from the PPM Toolkit
- RAS – Sun Raster
- SVG – Scalable Vector Graphics
- TGA – Truevision Targa
- TIFF – Tagged Image File Format
- WBMP – Wireless Application Protocol Bitmap Format
- WebP
- XBM – X BitMap
- XPM – X PixMap

Eye of GNOME also supports viewing Exif/XMP metadata associated with an image.

=== Limitations ===
Eye of GNOME does not support DirectDraw Surface (.dds) or JPEG 2000

== See also ==
- Comparison of image viewers
- gThumb – another image viewer for GNOME with organizing and image editing functions
