= Popover (GUI) =

User interface element

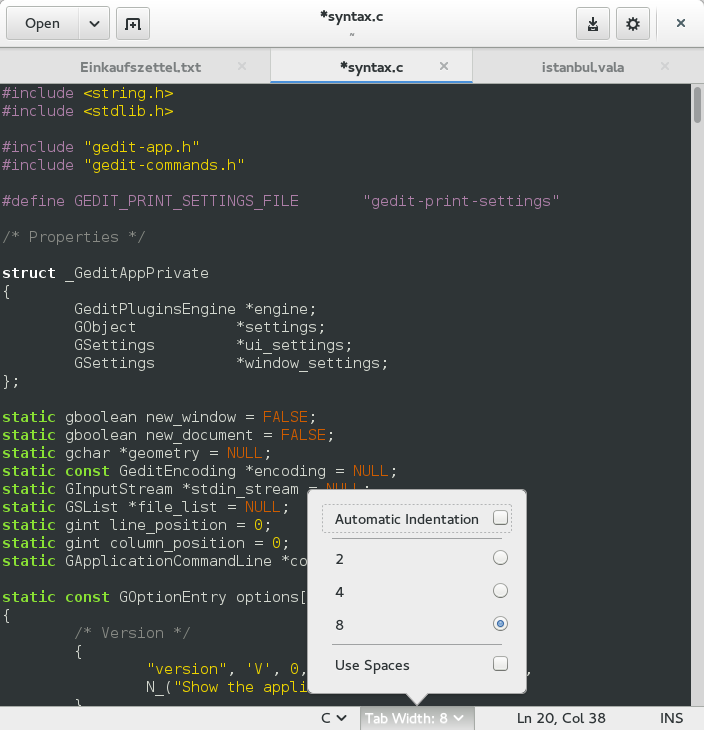
This popover belongs to the status bar of gedit. It contains two checkboxes and a radio button.

A popover is a container-type graphical control element that hovers over its parent window. It can contain various other graphical control elements such as checkboxes, radio buttons, or list boxes. Like any container-type graphical control element, it is meant to group elements that belong together.

Popover graphical control elements were introduced in GTK+ 3.12.

Apple included popovers in their human interface guidelines. Popovers are in use on the web. Bootstrap has a component to create popovers, similar to those found in iOS.

When hovering a link in Wikipedia, by default, there is a popup of page preview that is in a way a popover: it includes a button and it has more content than in tooltip.
