= Glade Interface Designer =

Graphical user interface builder

Glade

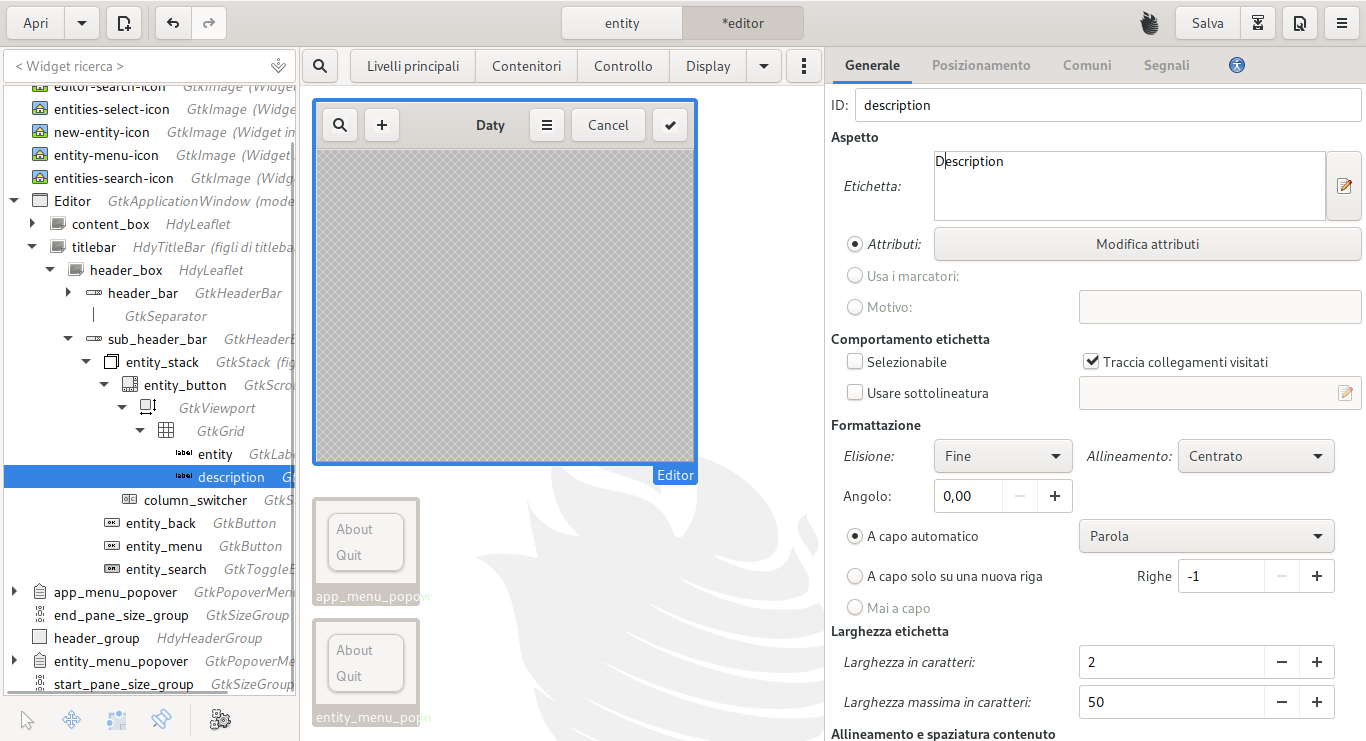
- Designing a preferences dialog in Glade
- Original author: Damon Chaplin
- Developer: The GNOME Project
- Initial release: 18 April 1998; 28 years ago
- Final release: 3.40 / 10 August 2022; 3 years ago
- Written in: C, XML
- Operating system: Unix-like, Windows
- Platform: GNU/Linux, Unix-like
- Successor: Cambalache Interface Designer
- Type: GUI builder; Linux on the desktop; Human interface guidelines
- License: GNU General Public License
- Website: glade.gnome.org
- Repository: gitlab.gnome.org/GNOME/glade.git

Glade Interface Designer is a graphical user interface builder for GTK, with additional components for GNOME. In its third version, Glade is programming language–independent, and does not produce code for events, but rather an XML file that is then used with an appropriate binding (such as GtkAda for use with the Ada programming language).

Glade is free and open-source software distributed under the GNU General Public License. Glade's development and maintenance ceased in 2022, with the final release on 10 August 2022. Its successor is Cambalache.

== History and development ==
The first Glade release, version 0.1, was made on 18 April 1998.

Glade 3 was released on 12 August 2006. According to the Glade Web site, the most noticeable differences for the end-user are:

- Undo and redo support in all operations.
- Support for multiple open projects.
- Removal of code generation.
- Contextual help system with Devhelp

Most of the difference is in the internals. Glade-3 is a complete rewrite, in order to take advantage of the new features of GTK+ 2 and the GObject system (Glade-3 was started when Glade-1 hadn't yet been ported to GTK+ 2). Therefore, the Glade-3 codebase is smaller and allows new interesting things, including:

- Catalogs of "pluggable" widgets. This means that external libraries can provide their set of widgets at runtime and Glade will detect them. In fact, Glade 3 supports only standard GTK widgets; GNOME UI and DB widgets are provided separately.
- The various Glade Tools (palette, editor, etc.) are implemented as widgets. This allows for easier integration in IDEs like Anjuta, and makes it easier to change the Glade UI.

On 5 April 2011, two parallel installable stable Glade versions were released:

- Glade 3.8: That includes all support for GTK+ up till version 2.24. This version is to serve as a decent migration path for older projects migrating to GTK+ 3.0.
- Glade 3.10: That includes support only for widgets that are still included in GTK+ 3.0 and additionally drops support for Libglade.

On 11 June 2015 Glade 3.19.0 was released. It depends at least on GTK+ 3.16.0. Among many bug fixes this version is the first to support the widgets GtkStack, GtkHeaderBar and GtkSidebar.

== GtkBuilder ==
GtkBuilder is the XML format that the Glade Interface Designer uses to save its forms. These documents can then be used in conjunction with the GtkBuilder object to instantiate the form using GTK. GladeXML is the XML format that was used with conjunction with libglade, which is now deprecated.

Glade Interface Designer automatically generates all the source code for a graphical control element.

The "Gtk.Builder class" allows user interfaces to be designed without writing code. The class describes the interface in an Extensible Markup Language (XML) file and then loads the XML description at runtime and creating the objects automatically. The Glade Interface Designer allows creation of the user interface in a WYSIWYG manner. The description of the user interface is independent from the programming language being used.

== Code sketching ==
Code sketchers are software applications that help a user create source code from a GladeXML file. Most code sketchers create source code which uses libglade and a GladeXML file to create the GUI. Some sketchers are able to create raw code that does not need the GladeXML file. The table below compares basic information about GladeXML code sketcher packages.

Name	Author	Programming languages	Software license
eglade	Daniel Elphick	Eiffel	Eiffel Forum License
Gladex	Christopher Pax and Charles Edward Pax	Perl, Python, Ruby	GPLv3
glc	Bill Allen	Python	LGPL
ruby-glade-create-template	Masao Mutoh	Ruby	
Tepache	Sandino Flores Moreno	Python	LGPL
GladeToBac	Thomas Freiherr	FreeBASIC (includes headers for GTK-3 and GTK-2.22.0 / GTKGlExt-1.2.0)	GPLv3
Glade2FB	Arnel Borja	FreeBASIC	GPLv3
gate3	F. J. Fabien	Ada	MIT License

== Cambalache ==
Cambalache

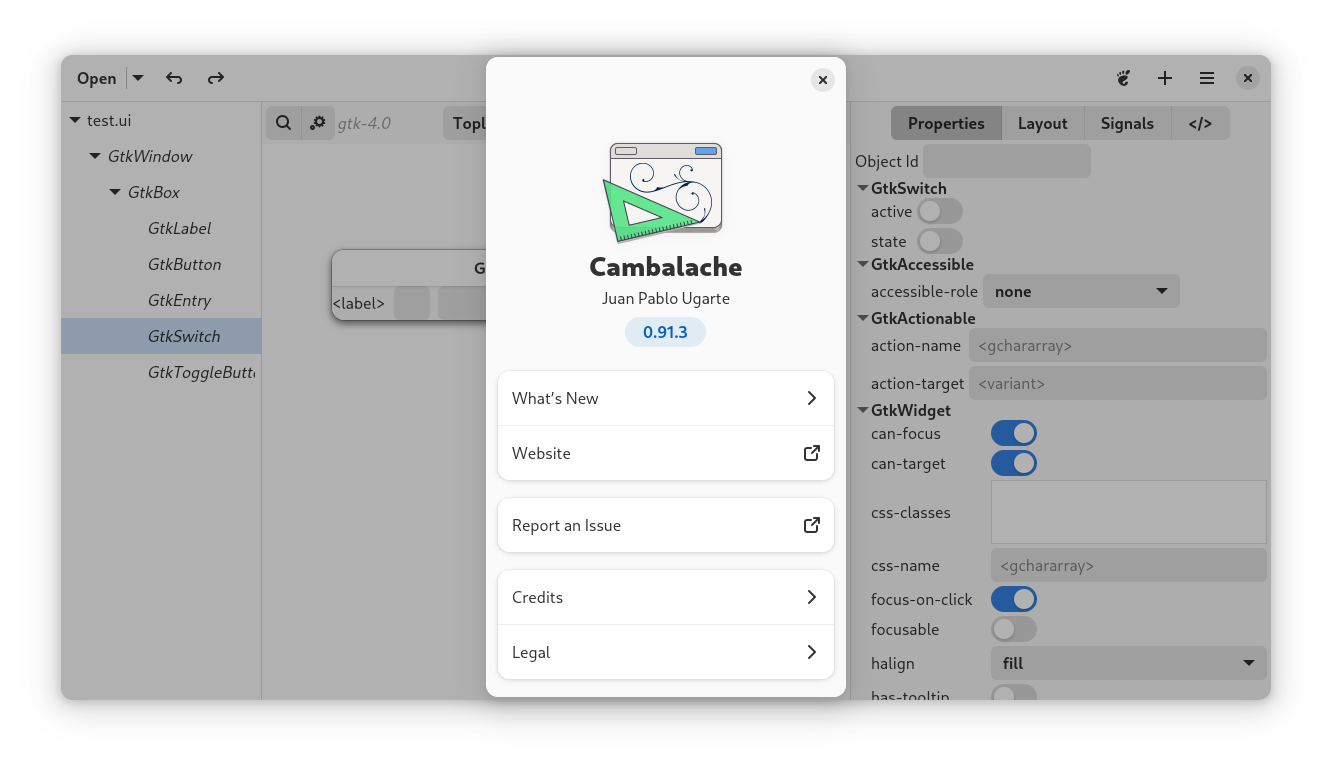
- Original author: Juan Pablo Ugarte
- Written in: Python
- Operating system: Unix-like
- Predecessor: Glade Interface Designer
- Type: GUI builder; Linux on the desktop; Human interface guidelines
- License: GNU Lesser General Public License
- Website: https://flathub.org/apps/ar.xjuan.Cambalache
- Repository: https://gitlab.gnome.org/jpu/cambalache

Cambalache (/kambaˈlat͡ʃe/) is a free and open-source rapid application development (RAD) tool designed for creating user interfaces with GTK 4. It is designed as a successor to Glade, with a focus on supporting the GTK 4 library while maintaining compatibility with GTK 3. Cambalache is geared toward developers working within the GNOME ecosystem. Cambalache's design emphasizes the model–view–controller (MVC) architecture, ensuring separation between the UI components and the business logic of applications.

For rendering the UI preview, Cambalache uses Casilda, a Wayland compositor embedded in a GTK widget. This architectural choice improves stability by separating the user interface preview from the main application. Casilda utilizes the wlroots library and supports native rendering via dmabufs, allowing client applications to use hardware-accelerated graphics. This separation enables the system to handle different GTK versions efficiently, ensuring the rendered UI accurately mirrors the application's appearance and behavior.

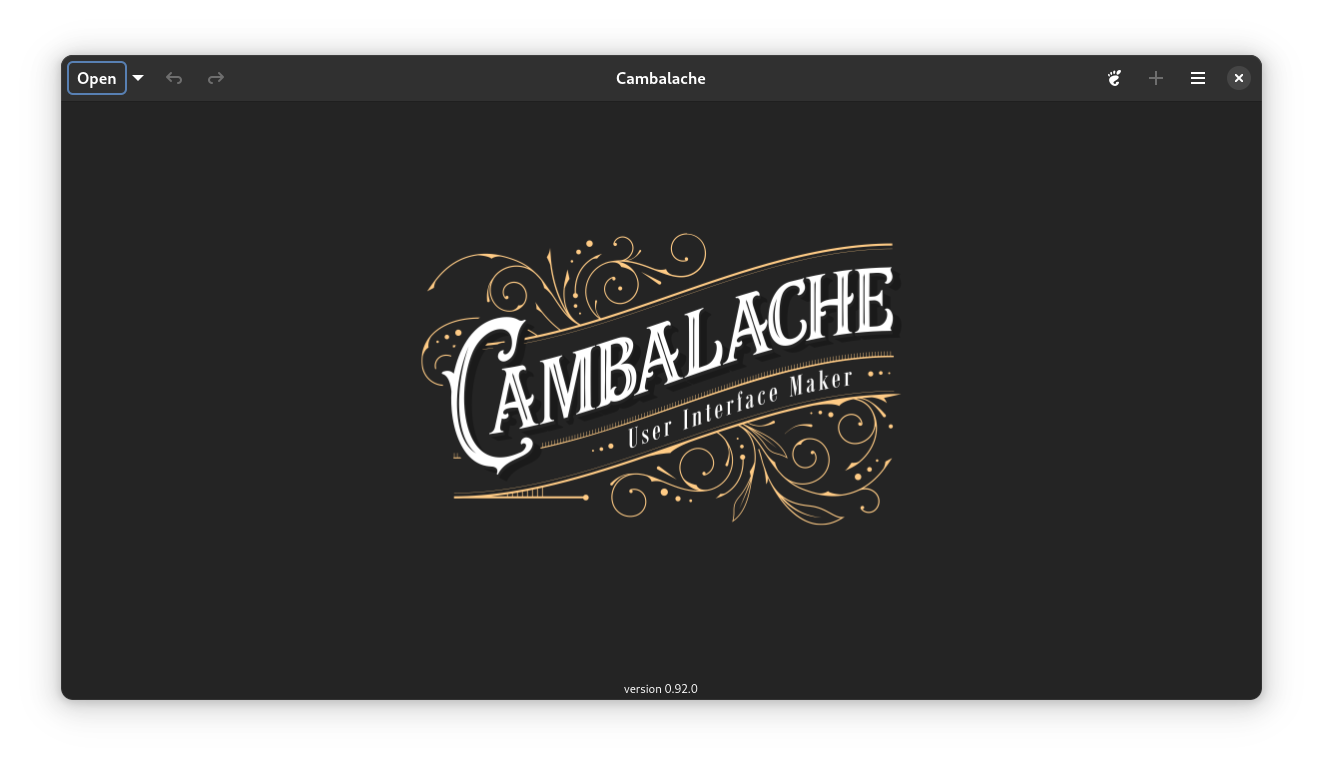

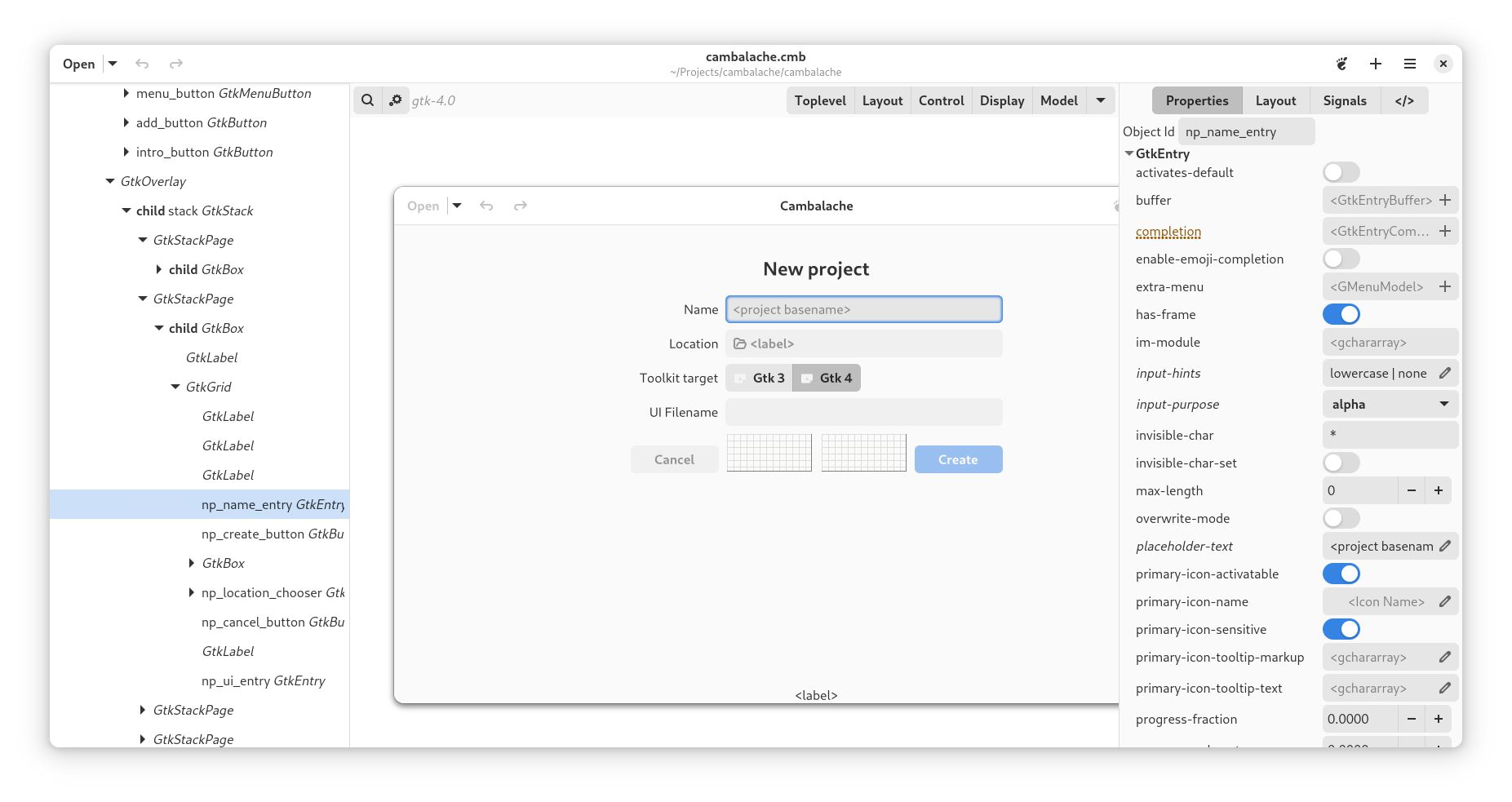

== See also ==
- List of language bindings for GTK
- Interface Builder
- Microsoft Blend
- Qt Designer
- XUL
