= SMMCore standard =

Singaporean metadata standard

The SMM Core standard (Singapore Multimedia Metadata Set) is Singapore's national metadata standard for B2B content exchange. In 2008, seeing a need for the adoption of best practices and standards for managing the storage of digital content through a set of metadata frameworks, the Infocomm Development Authority of Singapore (IDA) organized an industry roundtable through which Mediacorp chaired the Metadata Standardization Subgroup, working with other industry providers, such as Disney and Ascent Media, to define a set of practices for metadata used in the local media industry. Initially, SMM Core was built on the foundation of PBCore. However, with its second revision in 2011, harmonization work has been carried out with the European Broadcasting Union (EBU), revising the SMM Core framework to be built on the foundation of the EBU Core. Harmonization allows for support from a larger metadata community of people versed in the field, access to knowledge on semantic web and linked data for which EBU and therefore SMM Core are ready, adoption by the industry, sharing resources in research, development, and maintenance of the metadata specifications.

== Scope ==
The subgroup identifies seven groups of first-level elements, which are:

- Identifier group – e.g., smmcoreIdentifier, smmcoreSource
- Title group – e.g., smmcoreTitle,smmcoreAlternateTtile,smmcoreVersion
- Description group – e.g., smmcoreDescription
- Audience group – e.g., smmcoreAudience (genre, rating)
- Rights group – e.g., smmcoreRights(rights,rightsLink,rightsHolder,coverage,rightsId,rightsClearanceFlag,contactDetails)
- Instantiation group – e.g., smmcoreFormat(fileInfo,videoFormat,audioFormat,subtitleFormat)
- Others group – e.g., smmcoreAssociateData,smmcoreAssetData,smmcorePublicationHistory,smmcoreContributor

A common library of basic attributes groups and derived data types are defined as well.

== Methodology ==
The subgroup adopted the approach of identifying the market participants and their transactional requirements gathered from a survey conducted, and then using an established standard as a baseline to get started.

== See also ==
- Dublin core
- PBCore
