= Local Government Category List =

British government database

The Local Government Category List (LGCL), is a metadata standard controlled vocabulary of subject metadata terms related to local government, published in the UK. It has been superseded by the Integrated Public Sector Vocabulary (IPSV) but remains available for reference.

== Development ==
The LGCL was developed by the Local Authority Websites National Project (LAWs), an initiative that aimed to meet the "requirement for a structured approach to information handling, publication and navigation". The LGCL was created as part of the Information Architecture & Standards project strand, the responsibility for which was delegated to the London Borough of Camden. Version 1.0 was released in October 2003 and version 1.01 in the following month. Version 1.02 was released in January 2004 and officially remains the current full version. Version 1.03 was published in March 2004 but is still considered to be a draft. The LGCL was merged with the Government Category List, and the seamlessUK taxonomy to form the Integrated Public Sector Vocabulary (IPSV) as part of the UK Government e-GMS initiative. The LGCL has since been mapped back to the IPSV as well as having been mapped to the Government Category List and the Local Government Services List (the 'PID List') and the previous APLAWS Category List. The LGCL and mappings are published in XML, PDF and Word formats. LGCL is formally deprecated in favour of the IPSV.

== Description ==
The LGCL comprises a poly-hierarchy of terms, comprising thirteen broad high-level terms divided into increasingly detailed sub-levels. The top-level terms are:

- Business
- Community and living
- Council, government and democracy
- Education and learning
- Environment
- Health and social care
- Housing
- Jobs and careers
- Legal services
- Leisure and culture
- Policing and public safety
- Social issues
- Transport and streets

These top-level terms are each divided into two-level terms, some of which may be further subdivided into as many as four further sublevels of detail. Thus, for example, "Wheelchairs" appears as a sixth-level subdivision of Health and social care:

- Health and social care
  - Health and medical care
    - Physical disability
      - Disability equipment
        - Mobility
          - Wheelchairs

Terms may be repeated at different levels but have consistent meanings, so, for example, "Cycling" appears as a type of transport route under "Transport and streets","Cycling, pedestrian and other pathways","Cycling" as well as an outdoor pursuit under "Leisure and culture","Sports","Types of sports", "Outdoor pursuits", "Cycling". Synonyms are provided for many of the preferred terms. The standard also includes a commitment that terms will never be removed from the list, but may change status or move position in the hierarchy between versions.

== Use ==
One of the intended uses of the standard was to provide a default local authority Web site navigation hierarchy that could be used flexibly with an appropriate level of detail to meet local requirements. The standard was also recommended for use as the basis of records management system file plans.

== Availability ==
The LGCL remains freely available "without guarantees and without licensing costs" and may be used and reproduced free of charge provided specific restrictions and appropriate attribution are respected.
