= E-GIF =

Scheme for ensuring the inter-operation of computer-based systems

An e-GIF, or eGovernment Interoperability Framework, is a scheme for ensuring the inter-operation of computer-based systems. It is intended to resolve and prevent (or at least minimise) problems arising from incompatible content of different computer systems. An e-GIF may aim to facilitate government processes at local, national or international levels.

== International implementations ==
About 30 countries and international bodies are known to have implemented some form of e-GIF, most, but not all, using the "e-GIF" acronym. Within the EU many of these were supported by the European Interoperability Framework (EIF) of the IDABC. These included Denmark, Greece, the United Kingdom and the Reach "Public Services Broker" in Ireland.

In Africa COMESA and Ghana provide examples of similar initiatives, whilst Bhutan and Thailand are examples from Asia. New Zealand and Australia, similarly, implemented their own frameworks. In the United States the National Information Exchange Model (NIEM) shared similar aims.

== Aims of e-GIF ==
- to enable the seamless flow of information across government / Public Service Organisations
- to set practical standards using stable well supported products
- to provide support, guidance and toolkits to enable the standards to be met
- to provide a long-term strategy, able to accommodate and adapt.

== Key e-GIF policies ==
- alignment with the Internet: the universal adoption of common specifications used on the Internet and World Wide Web for public sector information systems
- adoption of XML as the primary standard for data integration and presentation tools for government systems
- adoption of the browser as the key interface; all public sector information systems are to be accessible through browser based technology; other interfaces are permitted but only in addition to browser based ones
- the addition of metadata to government information resources
- the development and adoption of Metadata standards such as the UK e-Government Metadata Standard (e-GMS) based on the international Dublin Core model
- the development and maintenance of standard category lists such as the UK Government Category List (GCL) and IPSV.
- adherence to a catalogue of Technical Standards such as the UK Technical Standards Catalogue.
- adherence to the e-GIF was mandated throughout the public sector.

== Drivers for selection of e-GIF specifications ==
- interoperability - only specifications that are relevant to systems interconnectivity, data integration, e-services access and content management are specified
- market support - the specifications selected are widely supported by the market, and likely to reduce the cost and risk of government information systems
- scalability - specifications selected have capacity to be scaled to satisfy changed demands made on the system, such as changes in data volumes, number of transactions or number of users
- openness - the specifications are documented and available to the public at large.

== Establishing competence and capability in e-GIF ==
In the UK, the e-GIF Accreditation Authority accredited organisations for their capability and competence in delivering e-GIF compliant solutions. There was also a programme of individual certifications at Foundation and Expert levels aimed at developing and recognising e-GIF skills and experience, referenced against an e-GIF Competency Framework. The UK e-GIF Compliance Assessment Service, operated by the NCC, offered a self-assessment tool for e-GIF compliance in projects and programmes.

== Fate ==
Within the UK, e-GIF was replaced by the "Open Source, Open Standards And Re-Use: Government Action Plan", published by the Cabinet Office in February 2009. This is now embodied in the Open Standards principles policy. The UK e-GIF documentation and UK Government Data Standards Catalogue have been archived and are available for reference only. Although now deprecated by the Cabinet Office, many systems have been built around the framework and continue to use e-GIF components, notably within the NHS.
