= Isurv =

isurv
- Categories: Real estate
- First issue: 2003
- Company: Royal Institution of Chartered Surveyors (RICS)
- Country: United Kingdom
- Language: English
- Website: www.isurv.com

Isurv is an online information service for expertise in natural and built environments. It was launched in September 2003 by the Royal Institution of Chartered Surveyors (RICS) and provides insight from verified legal experts and industry practitioners relating to construction.

Isurv contains technical information on a broad range of property and construction-related topics, as well as government legislation, RICS regulations, case law library, and property market surveys and research. It provides access to all of RICS standards and guidance notes, including The Red Book and Black Books.

== History ==
Following its creation in 2003, Isurv was relaunched in early 2008 on the Jadu Content Management System platform. In 2009, the site expanded to include Isurv Residential Lettings, which is aimed at the estate agency sector, and the New Rules of Measurement, aimed at those involved in cost management. The site was revamped in 2017, expanding to include a brand new channel on infrastructure as well as Red Book 2017.

== Structure and content ==
Isurv is published by the RICS Knowledge Business, a division of the Royal Institution of Chartered Surveyors. Isurv covers a range of topics relating to the property and construction industries, and users may view directories on these topics by author or editorial boards. They are:

1. Valuation
2. Commercial property
3. Building surveying
4. Construction
5. Professional Conduct
6. Rural
7. Residential
8. Sustainability
9. Planning
10. Infrastructure
11. APC and AssocRICS

The following RICS standards are available on Isurv:

1. RICS Valuation Standards (the 'RICS Red Book')
2. RICS new rules of measurement
3. RICS property measurement

There are sections of the site that guide property professionals through the various routes to RICS membership and provide resources for continuing professional development (CPD).

The development of content for the site is overseen by leading figures in the property and construction industries. Expert technical guidance is interlinked with UK legislation, RICS regulations, forms, contracts, and checklists. Technical briefings are added daily.

== Awards ==
In 2008, Isurv was shortlisted for Online Publishing Awards. The awards, from the Association of Online Publishers (AOP), are a unique showcase for innovation in the digital publishing industry. Isurv was shortlisted in the Online Publisher 2008 - Business category along with efinancialnews.com, E-consultancy.com, Reed Business Information, TSL Education, and Wildfire Communications Ltd.

In 2004, Isurv won the ALPSP Award for Publishing Innovation. From the judges: "We can envisage that (Isurv) will evolve into the source of information and services for RICS members. Isurv is the first service to provide a wealth of best practice materials with regularly updated commentary and tools including downloadable forms at an affordable price."

== Readership ==
Although it is predominately UK-based, Isurv receives visitors from more than 80 countries. The UK, France, and the UAE generate the most traffic, but the site is also visited by residents of territories including:

- India
- Caribbean Nations
- Vietnam
- Mayotte (island of the coast of Africa)
- Sweden
- New Zealand

== See also ==
- Chartered surveyors in the United Kingdom
- RICS Americas
- Chartered Institute of Building, a sister professional body within the built environment
