= HipHop for PHP =

Set of alternative PHP implementations developed by Facebook

- Developer: Facebook, Inc.
- Release: February 2, 2010; 16 years ago
- Final release: Replaced by HHVM / 2013; 13 years ago
- Written in: C++, Hack, OCaml, Rust
- Successor: HHVM
- License: PHP License
- Website: github.com/facebook/hiphop-php
- Repository: github.com/facebook/hhvm

HipHop for PHP (HPHPc) is a discontinued PHP transpiler created by Facebook. By using HPHPc as a source-to-source compiler, PHP code is translated into C++, compiled into a binary and run as an executable, as opposed to the PHP's usual execution path of PHP code being transformed into opcodes and interpreted. HPHPc consists mainly of C++, C and PHP source codes, and it is free and open-source software distributed under the PHP License.

The original motivation behind HipHop was to save resources on Facebook servers, given the large PHP codebase of facebook.com. As the development of HipHop progressed, it was realised that HipHop could substantially increase the speed of PHP applications in general. Increases in web page generation throughput by factors of up to six have been observed over the Zend PHP. A stated goal of HPHPc was to provide a high level of compatibility for Zend PHP, where most Zend-based PHP programs run unmodified on HPHPc. HPHPc was originally open sourced in early 2010.

As an addition to HPHPc, Facebook engineers also created a "developer mode" of HipHop (interpreted version of a PHP execution engine, known as HPHPi) and the HipHop debugger (known as HPHPd). These additions allow developers to run PHP code through the same logic provided by HPHPc while making it possible to interactively debug PHP code by defining watches, breakpoints, etc. Running the code through HPHPi yields lower performance when compared to HPHPc, but the developer benefits were, at the time, worth having to maintain these two execution engines for production and development. HPHPi and HPHPd were also open sourced in 2010.

By many accounts HPHPc fulfilled its goals, especially within Facebook as it allowed facebook.com to run much faster while using fewer resources. However, in early 2013 Facebook deprecated HPHPc in favor of the HipHop Virtual Machine (HHVM), which is a just-in-time (JIT) compilation-based execution engine for PHP, also developed by Facebook. There were many reasons for this; one of them was HPHPc's flattened curve for further performance improvements. Also, HPHPc did not fully support the PHP language, including the create_function() and eval() constructs, and it involved a specific time- and resource-consuming deployment process that required a bigger than 1 GB binary to be compiled and distributed to many servers in short order. In addition, maintaining HPHPc and HPHPi in parallel (as they needed to be, for the consistency of production and development environments) was becoming cumbersome. Finally, HPHPc was not a drop-in replacement for Zend, requiring external customers to change their whole development and deployment processes to use HPHPc.

== See also ==
- Parrot virtual machine
- Phalanger
