= Alison Taylor (politician) =

British politician

Member of Parliament for Paisley and Renfrewshire North
- Incumbent
- Assumed office 4 July 2024
- Preceded by: Gavin Newlands
- Majority: 6,333 (15.2%)

Personal details
- Party: Labour
- Website: alisontaylor.org.uk

Alison Suzanne Watt Taylor is a Scottish Labour politician who has been the Member of Parliament (MP) for Paisley and Renfrewshire North since 2024.

== Career ==
Alison Taylor studied land economics at a Paisley university and is a fellow of the Royal Institution of Chartered Surveyors. She has worked as a chartered surveyor.

== Parliamentary career ==
Taylor ran for Parliament in the 2017 and 2019 general elections as the Labour candidate for Paisley and Renfrewshire North, finishing second to Gavin Newlands on both occasions. She won Paisley and Renfrewshire North from Newlands in the 2024 general election with a majority of 6,333.

Parliament of the United Kingdom
| Preceded by Gavin Newlands | Member of Parliament for Paisley and Renfrewshire North; 2024–present | Incumbent |
