= Phalanger (disambiguation) =

Phalanger may refer to:

== Marsupials ==
- Phalanger, a genus of possum in the family Phalangeridae
- Other members of the family Phalangeridae, typically known as brushtail possums and cuscuses
- Gliding possums, also known as flying phalangers
- Various other members of the order Diprotodontia

== Other uses ==
- Phalanger (compiler), a PHP compiler
