= Jadu =

Jadu may refer to:

- Jadu (company), British software company
- Jadu, Libya, village
- The Jadu, South Korean rock band
- Jadu (artist), German musician Jadu
- Prunus salicina, Asian fruit tree

== See also ==
- Jadoo (disambiguation)
- Jaadugar (disambiguation)
- Jaadu, 1995 Indian film
