= E-GMS =

The e-Government Metadata Standard, e-GMS, is the UK e-Government Metadata Standard. It defines how UK public sector bodies should label content such as web pages and documents to make such information more easily managed, found and shared.

The metadata standard is an application profile of the Dublin Core Metadata Element Set and consists of mandatory, recommended and optional metadata elements such as title, date created and description.

The e-GMS formed part of the e-Government Metadata Framework (e-GMF) and eGovernment Interoperability Framework (e-GIF). The standard helps provide a basis for the adoption of XML schemas for data exchange.

== Metadata elements ==
The current standard defines twenty-five elements. Each has a formal description (taken from Dublin Core where possible) and an obligation rating of "mandatory", "mandatory if applicable", "recommended" or "optional":

1. Accessibility (mandatory if applicable)
2. Addressee (optional)
3. Aggregation (optional)
4. Audience (optional)
5. Contributor (optional)
6. Coverage (recommended)
7. Creator (mandatory)
8. Date (mandatory)
9. Description (optional)
10. Digital signature (optional)
11. Disposal (optional)
12. Format (optional)
13. Identifier (mandatory if applicable)
14. Language (recommended)
15. Location (optional)
16. Mandate (optional)
17. Preservation (optional)
18. Publisher (mandatory if applicable)
19. Relation (optional)
20. Rights (optional)
21. Source (optional)
22. Status (optional)
23. Subject (mandatory)
24. Title (mandatory)
25. Type (optional)

Each element also has a statement of purpose, notes, clarification, refinements (such as sub-elements), examples of use, HTML syntax, encoding schemes and mappings to other metadata standards where applicable.

== Development ==
The first version of the standard comprising simple Dublin Core elements was first published with the e-GMF. E-GMS was first published as a separate document by the Office of the e-Envoy in April 2002 and contained twenty-one elements. Version 2 was released in December 2003 and added separate elements for Addressee, Aggregation, Digital Signature and Mandate. Version 2 also added further refinements and introduced the e-GMS Audience Encoding Scheme (e-GMSAES) and e-GMS Type Encoding Scheme (e-GMSTES). Version 3 was released in April 2004 and incorporated PRONOM within the format and preservation elements. The most recent version, 3.1, was published in August 2006 by the Cabinet Office e-Government Unit following the closure of the Office of the e-Envoy. It now forms part of the UK Government's Information Principles, supporting the principle that "Information is standardised and linkable". Responsibility for maintenance and development of the standard has since moved from central to local government.

== Subject metadata and the Integrated Public Sector Vocabulary (IPSV) ==
The Integrated Public Sector Vocabulary is a controlled vocabulary for describing subjects and was first released in April 2005, building on developments of the subject element introduced with version 3.0 of e-GMS. It merged three earlier lists: the GCL (Government Category List), LGCL (Local Government Category List) and the seamlessUK taxonomy. It had 2732 preferred terms and, 4230 non-preferred.

The current version, version 2, was released in April 2006. It is much bigger, with 3080 preferred terms and 4843 non-preferred terms, and covers internal-facing as well as public-oriented topics. The Internal Vocabulary was released as a separate subset containing 756 preferred terms and 1333 non-preferred terms. An abridged version of the IPSV was also released containing 549 preferred terms and 1472 non-preferred terms and remains compliant with the e-GMS.

The Public Sector Information Domain – Metadata Standards Working Group subsequently agreed to recommend this change to eGMS on the use of subject metadata from October 2012:

Where you identify value in using the subject element of metadata it should be populated from a controlled vocabulary that is used consistently across the sector to which the information relates. In preference, vocabularies should be published according to SKOS and publicly available for free re-use, which then enables tagged information to be further grouped, and associated, by an agent. SKOS also encourages cross-references to be made across otherwise unconnected vocabularies.

This change reflects advances in searching techniques since the introduction of eGMS, and modern approaches to cataloguing and cross-referencing information against evolving terminologies.

IPSV is no longer directly referenced and mandated within eGMS, allowing the publisher to consider if subject tagging is valuable, and to use the vocabulary that best describes their business. Therefore, the mandate to use IPSV no longer applies, although IPSV remains an option.

— ESD,

The standard has been discontinued in January 2019. The Local Government Association esd-toolkit has since continued hosting IPSV and current URIs will remain valid.

== Mapping ==
E-GMS has been mapped to the IEEE/LOM. IPSV has been mapped to the Local Government Classification Scheme.

== See also ==
Examples of UK government sponsored GovTalk XML standards that use e-GMS include

- NaPTAN
- TransXChange
