= AGLS =

AGLS may refer to:

- Atlanta Gas Light Services
- Australian Government Locator Service, Australian metadata standard, AS 5044-2010
- Automatic Gun Laying System
