= Trinity High School, Renfrew =

Roman Catholic high school in Renfrew, Scotland

Coordinates: 55.877°N 4.387°W

Information
- Religious affiliation: Catholicism
- Houses: Therese House; Andrew's House; Columba's House; Margaret's House
- Website: blogs.glowscotland.org.uk/re/trinityhighschool/

Trinity High School is a Roman Catholic secondary school in Renfrew, Scotland.

The school's building was originally the site of the state school Renfrew High, but in 1975 Renfrew High School moved to a new larger site, and the building became Trinity High School.

Over the years an ICT block and an extension have been built. The extension now houses the Religious Education department, Home Economics department and the Modern Languages department.

The school's pastoral system is organised into four houses. They are: Therese House, Andrew's House, Columba's House and Margaret's House.

== Notable alumni ==
- Gavin Newlands (b. 1980) - SNP MP for Paisley and Renfrewshire North 2015–2024
- Chris Stephens (b. 1973) - SNP MP for Glasgow South West 2015–2024
