= Jaadugar =

Jaadugar or Jadugar (lit. 'magician') may refer to:

- Jadugar, a 1946 Indian Hindi-language film
- Jaadugar (1989 film), an Indian Hindi-language fantasy comedy film
- Jaadugar (2022 film), an Indian Hindi-language sports drama film
- Jadugar Shakoora, a supervillain from Raj Comics
- Chota Jadugar, a 2003 Indian children's fantasy film directed by Jose Punnoose
- A Witch's Life in Mongol (Tenmaku no Jādūgaru, lit. 'Jaadugar of the Tent'), a Japanese manga series

== See also ==
- Jadoo (disambiguation)
- Jadu (disambiguation)
