= ScrollKeeper =

Document cataloging system

- Developers: Laszlo Kovacs; Malcolm Tredinnick; Dan Mueth
- Stable release: 0.3.14 / December 5, 2003
- Written in: C
- Operating system: Linux
- Type: Document cataloging
- Website: Official website

ScrollKeeper is a document cataloging system. It manages documentation metadata, as specified by the Open Source Metadata Framework (OMF). ScrollKeeper was used by the GNOME desktop help browser, Yelp, but has since been replaced by Rarian. It was also used by the KDE help browser and ScrollServer documentation server.
