= Z39.87 =

Metadata standard for digital images

ANSI/NISO Z39.87 is a standard which defines a set of metadata elements for raster digital images. The purpose is to help in the development, exchange and interpretation of digital images. The dictionary functions of this standard assist in the interoperability between systems, services, and software. It is also an aid in the long-term management of and continuing access to digital image collections.

== See also ==
- Metadata standards
- Metadata Encoding and Transmission Standard (METS)

== Bibliography ==
- NISO standard publication: ISBN 978-1-880124-67-3, ANSI Approval Date: 12/18/06
