= Australian Government Locator Service =

Metadata service for the Australian government

The Australian Government Locator Service (AGLS) Metadata Standard, originally known as the Australian Government Locator Service, was created by the National Archives of Australia as a standard to describe government resources. It was published for a general audience by Standards Australia as AS 5044:2002, and reissued as AS 5044-2010 on 30 June 2010. AGLS is used by some government agencies in Australia to describe online resources and services.

AGLS is an application profile of the Dublin Core metadata standard.

In December 2022, the National Archives of Australia announced its intention to decommission the AGLS website by the end of 2023 and to rescind the mandate for its use by Australian Government agencies. The AGLS Metadata Standard website has been archived by the National Library of Australia and remains available on Trove.

== See also ==
- Cunningham, Adrian (September 2001). "Six degrees of separation: Australian metadata initiatives and their relationships with international standards". Archival Science. 1 (3). Netherlands: Springer: 271–283. doi:10.1007/BF02437691. ISSN 1573-7519. S2CID 143901623.
- Sokvitne, Lloyd. "An evaluation of the Effectiveness of Current Dublin Core Metadata for Retrieval" (PDF).
- Paivarinta, Tero; Tyrvainen, Pasi; Ylimaki, Tanja. "Defining organizational document metadata: a case beyond standards".
- Klischewski, Ralf; Ukena, Stefan. "Designing Semantic e-Government Services Driven by User Requirements". Workshop Proceedings EGOV.
