= SimpleDL =

SimpleDL is a digital collection of management software that allows for the upload, description, management and access of digital collections. It is UTF-8 compatible and is not limited by format, capable of handling documents, PDFs, images, videos, audio files, and data-only objects. Furthermore, it can connect content so that multi-page documents, scores, or books can be uploaded and organized into chapters, books, or by page number. It can also combine any number of images into one single display object. The software is mostly used by libraries, archives, museums, government agencies, universities, corporations, historical societies, and other organizations that wish to host a digital collection.

On March 24, 2016, SimpleDL announced that it was being purchased by Sobek Digital Hosting and Consulting LLC, which offers digital consulting and hosting services and supports the open-source SobekCM digital hosting software.

== Design ==
SimpleDL is standards-based and supports numerous industry standards including Unicode, Qualified Dublin Core, XML, and OAI-PMH. The metadata is based on Dublin Core, a flexible extensible metadata standard created by OCLC in 1995. Dublin Core has been accepted as a NISO standard.

== The Process: How It Works ==
Digital items can be added to a SimpleDL digital collection through standard web browsers and standard web interfaces. Items can be added one at a time or in batches. The digital collections reside on a server, either locally or at the firm.

Additional functions are available such as creating and editing metadata templates, administering the use of controlled vocabularies, importing metadata (tab-delimited text), exporting metadata in XML, generating OCR during the import-export using the OCR Extension, and viewing statistical reports.

== Framework ==
Searching abilities are provided by a custom Solr build, permanent storage is provided by the MySQL database engine, and pages are served through the Apache HTTP Server and PHP. The software has an option to store and deliver the digital documents with Amazon S3 to provide high durability of files. Collections hosted by SimpleDL utilize Amazon EC2 servers.
