= Application profile =

In the information sciences, an application profile consists of a set of metadata elements, policies, and guidelines defined for a particular application.

The elements may come from one or more element sets, thus allowing a given application to meet its functional requirements by using metadata from several element sets - including locally defined sets. For example, a given application might choose a subset of the Dublin Core that meets its needs, or may include elements from the Dublin Core, another element set, and several locally defined elements, all combined in a single schema. An application profile is not complete without documentation that defines the policies and best practices appropriate to the application. As another example, the legal document standard Akoma Ntoso is universal scope and very flexible, which creates the risk of ambiguous representations. Therefore, when AKN is to be used in a local domain, it can be advisable to reduce the overall flexibility and complexity by specifying a uniform usage of a subset of AKN XML elements for the given use case.

== Advantages ==
- Defines an application-appropriate set of properties in a public and communicable manner. This permits the building of loosely coupled systems (i.e. independent of each other's detailed specifications) that still offer powerful capabilities.

== Disadvantages ==
- Narrow application scope, which may limit a profile's widespread applicability and also limits the likely synergy from re-use of tools from other projects outside that scope.
- Compared to the Dublin Core refinement approach (where a core property set may be made more specific, in a backwards-compatible manner), use of application profiles requires that applications must at least recognise these profiles and their roots. Even if the profile is based simply on Dublin Core, which the application already understands, this is of no use unless the application also recognises that this profile is treatable as Dublin Core.

== Example profiles ==
- Bath Profile

An International Z39.50 Specification for Library Applications and Resource Discovery

- e-GMS

the UK e-Government Metadata Standard. An application profile of Dublin Core.
