= Jadu (company) =

Software companies of the United Kingdom

Jadu, A Netcall Company
- Type: Private
- Industry: Software
- Founded: 26 November 2000
- Headquarters: Leicester, United Kingdom
- Key people: Suraj Kika (Co-Founder) Andy Perkins (Co-Founder)
- Products: Web Experience Platform (Web Content Management, eForms, CRM)
- Website: jadu.net

Jadu is a provider of low-code Web Experience Management software, specialising in Web CMS, Forms, Portal and Customer Case Management tools for the enterprise.

Jadu also develops web applications related to document management, search and publishing. The company's global business is based in the UK with further operations in North America and a business based in Australia servicing the Asia Pacific region.

In December 2025, it was announced Jadu had been acquired by the Bedford, England-headquartered customer engagement software company, Netcall, for a maximum total consideration of £19.2 million.

== Company history ==
The company was founded by Suraj Kika and Richard Chamberlain in 1999 and began development when co-founder Andy Perkins joined in 2000. The system was first developed for the Department of Trade and Industry (now Department of Energy and Climate Change) for the UK consultation portal for Oil and Gas and Renewable Energy.

The software developed for the Offshore-SEA website, an environmental portal managed by geological and oceanographic specialists Geotek, then became Jadu Content Management Engine Version 1 - and was implemented for scientific organisations in the UK as a means to publish complex electronic documents generated in MS Word and PDF formats.

In 2001 the system was redeveloped in PHP and MySQL and a Version 2 was deployed for UK Government and Local Authorities. Based on the e-GIF standards, and using XForms, the system was deployed at the beginning of the first acceptance and adoption of open source platforms within Government. Jadu as a company has a cross platform approach, preferring to develop its software to be agnostic in terms of operating platform and development framework.

In 2008, Jadu launched a .NET compliant binary of the Jadu CMS supporting IIS, MS SQL and the .NET 2.0 framework using the Phalanger which compiles PHP to CLR (Microsoft's Common Language Runtime) effectively enabling any PHP application to run natively under the .NET framework.

Jadu have funded and are supporting the development of Phalanger, including leading the development of VisualStudio.NET support as well as other upgrades to PHP support in .NET. With this new framework under .NET 2.0 and .NET 3.0, Jadu CMS can be extended in C# or any other .NET compiled language using Visual Studio.

Using the Phalanger compiler, Jadu CMS (or any other PHP based applications) and the front end web templates can be compiled down to two DLLs. This brings together two competitive programming disciplines, making PHP interoperable with the .NET framework.

Jadu was the designer responsible for Lichfield District Council, becoming the first UK Local Authority to win a Webby Award Official Honoree status and The City of Edinburgh Council website, which was awarded a top 4-star rating for three years running, as "the best Local Government Website in Scotland" by SOCITM.

In 2007, Jadu's design for Kettering Borough Council was nominated a finalist for the CSS category in the SXSW (South by South West) awards - for "pushing the boundaries of CSS coding technology, bringing together top-notch design and content with standards compliant and accessible code"

In 2008, Jadu launched Manchester City Council's website using the Jadu CMS, which won the BT Online Excellence award as the Best Local Government website in Britain.

In January 2011, executives from Jadu were invited to a private round table discussion with UK Prime Minister, David Cameron to consult with Jadu over barriers to business growth in the UK

In October 2011, the company announced the 'Weejot' Mobile web app publishing service. Described as a network for easily developing and publishing mobile web apps to handheld mobile and tablet devices in real-time using HTML5, CSS3 and JQuery Mobile.

In February 2012, Jadu announced that their 'Jadu Universe Cloud' service, a platform for SaaS CMS, forms, search and mobile products was selected as a preferred supplier into the UK Government CloudStore. On its website, Jadu stated that Jadu Universe Cloud services can be purchased by public sector organisations directly from Cloudstore without an Official Journal of the European Union tender process, which represents a significant step change in UK Government procurement. Chris Chant, the Cabinet Office Executive Director confirmed that the Government was "making it easy for the public sector to buy a vast range of services – and so easy that they can try things out at nominal cost before taking it on for a whole organisation."

In the Spring of 2013, the Government announced that the G-Cloud has sold over £18.2m in products and services through the Cloudstore. Jadu were listed as 13th most purchased services with sales approaching £250,000 in just three months.

In March 2013, Jadu announced a partnership with PayPal to deliver mobile payments using the Weejot.com service, starting with mobile donations. Jadu, PayPal and The Alzheimer's Society co-launched 'Weejot Donate' a weejot.com template that enabled fundraising teams inside any charity to use the weejot.com mobile service to deploy mobile donations apps. The Weejot service was shut down in 2015 so the company could focus on its enterprise Customer Experience Management product strategy.

Jadu launched a re-designed Manchester City Council website using its Jadu Universe Platform on 1 May 2013 as a result of a collaboration between the council's web team and Jadu. The site was designed by Jadu's in-house 'Spacecraft' design agency using Responsive Web Design, reflecting Jadu's 'mobile first' vision for delivering web content to all devices.

In 2015, Jadu announced it had spun-out Spacecraft and created a new creative design company 'Spacecraft Digital' so that it could focus on creating an ecosystem of channel partners and other agencies that could benefit from using Jadu products and technology.

In 2020, Jadu announced 'Spacecraft Digital' was changing its name to 'Jadu Creative'.

=== Move to Continuous Delivery ===
Jadu collaborated with the Department for Communities and Local Government and Coventry City Council Chief Executive Martin Reeves to launch its move to Continuous Delivery, which the company said would save its Local Government customers over £2.5m in costs per year. Early in 2016, Jadu renamed the continuously released platform 'Continuum' as part of a global re-branding programme. The company now releases its platform every 2 weeks, launching a new Integrations Hub in 2017, which is designed to make integrations with back office cloud and on-premise applications non-technical and faster for its customers.

== Products ==
=== Jadu Central CMS (Web Content Management) ===
The company's core product, Jadu Central, is a suite of non-technical web-based content management application which covers publishing, directories, search, productivity and workflow, HR, e-payments, retail store management and e-forms.

In December 2008, Jadu launched the 1.8 version upgrade to the Jadu CMS (named 'Clearwater' by the company), which includes Semantic Web frameworks and a public API called 'MyJadu API'. The new version upgrade also introduced the concept of social 'directories' enabling structured data records to be either mass imported into the system and/or submitted by users of sites run by the Jadu CMS.

In April 2009, Jadu announced a social media module for the Jadu CMS which provides integration to the Twitter micro-blogging social network. The Jadu Twitter client provides content management with drafts and workflow approval for corporate tweets.

In April 2010, Jadu in collaboration with some of its customers, released an Election Results plugin for the Jadu CMS to its government user base to promote the use of Opendata in government. The plugin makes election result data available as RDFa.

Jadu Content Management System itself is a proprietary system, although the company has Open Sourced many of its tools, including its User Interface Design System which was introduced in a continuous release. The Jadu Continuum architecture is cross platform and runs in Windows and Linux and is provided both on-premise and hosted.

==== Jadu Galaxies (Cloud CMS deployment system) ====
In 2006, Jadu developed the Jadu Galaxies content management system. Galaxies (now a standard feature in the Jadu Universe Platform), provides the ability to clone CMS systems in real-time, creating a multi-tenant Software as a Service architecture and allowing customers to deploy their own CMS cloud services.

=== Jadu Central Forms (Forms deployment system) ===
Jadu XForms Professional (or XFP), now re-branded 'Jadu Central Forms', provides a non-technical framework for complex forms development. XForms Professional connects to back office systems (such as CRM) and e-payments systems to enable accessible transactional forms. In its early stages of development, Jadu XForms was recognised for adopting the W3C XForms standard.

In 2021, it was announced that the product was also embedded into 'Hyland Content Portal' by Hyland Software and available as an enterprise web forms and portal solution to its global 'OnBase' and 'Perceptive Content' customer base including The University of Arkansas, Carnegie Mellon University, The Resources for Human Development (RHD) and many others.

=== Jadu 'Connect' (Cloud based Case Management and CRM) ===
Directly as a result of the experience of working successfully with the Ministry of Justice, Jadu launched the Connect (formerly 'CXM' - Customer Experience Management) cloud service - a Case Management System designed for real-time collaboration on cases. The service is designed to help large organisations solve cases for customers, encouraging retention, but has its foundation in legal case management. The service combines 'instant chat' functionality with Case Management enabling real-time conversation to become case notes. Jadu developed the product as a multi-tenant cloud service, making the Continuum Platform a hybrid cloud product.

Early in 2017 Jadu announced that a large number of large organisations has started implementing Jadu Connect, including Canterbury City Council, who stated it intends to provide 85% of its services online using the Jadu Connect platform.

In 2018, the Jadu Connect service was adopted by Birmingham City Council as a direct replacement for their SAP CRM system. This marked a move in the Local Government market to replace CRM systems for 'low code' cloud based CRM and case management. In April 2022, Birmingham Council recorded that just under half of its population (over 500,000 users) were registered users of its 'BRUM' account, the personalised web account powered by the Jadu platform. By 2024, the humber had reached 650,000 registered users, almost 75% of the adult population of Birmingham.

In February 2022, Welwyn Hatfield Council announced that it had completed a full CRM, Forms and Website transformation in less than one year, having started with implementing the CXM service and designing its website around the digital services it had created using the low-code tools within Connect.

By 2022, The Jadu Connect service was processing over 20 million cases across most of the company's customer base after just 5 years since launch.

== Notable users ==
Jadu's customers tend to be substantially sized organisations. In 2008, Jadu announced the University of Leeds (one of the largest universities in the United Kingdom), who signed a long-term agreement with Jadu to deliver the Jadu CMS and Galaxies deployment system across the university, starting with the Leeds University Library. The largest user of the Jadu Digital Platform is Birmingham City Council, the largest Local Authority in Europe. Following implementation of the Jadu platform, Birmingham City was recognised in the 2017 Webby Awards as an Official Honouree. Also notable are The Manchester City Council, City of Edinburgh Council. and also the University of Minnesota. In Australia, Jadu is widely used by Local Authorities in the State of Queensland with services provided by the LGAQ (Local Government Association of Queensland) in 2024, Wasatch County Government implemented Jadu Platform propelling it from 1385 of over 3000 County Government organizations, to number 1 in the Silktide web accessibility index. Early in 2025, Liverpool City Council announced it had selected Jadu as its 'Digital Layer' citing AI and Automation as one of its objectives to significantly improve the user experience for its almost 500,000 residents. The contract was reported to be over £2.5m to deliver savings of over £1.8m annually.
