= Jadoo =

Jadoo or Jaadu (lit. 'magic') may refer to:

- Jadoo (1951 film), a 1951 Indian Hindi-language film
- Jaadu, a 1995 Indian Hindi-language film
- Jadoo (2013 film), the 2013 British film
- Kedi (2006 film), the 2006 Indian film, released as Jadoo in Telugu
- Jaadoo, hit debut album by Alisha Chinai 1985
- Jadoo, a fictional extraterrestrial being in the Krrish franchise of Indian films
  - J Bole Toh Jadoo, Indian TV show featuring the character
- JadooTV, a TV box with South Asian & Multicultural content

== See also ==
- Jadu (disambiguation)
- Jaadugar (disambiguation)
