= Renfrew High School =

Location
- Haining Road, Renfrew; Renfrew, Renfrewshire, PA4 0AN; Scotland; 55.872°N 4.385°W

Information
- Head Teacher: Andrew Sutherland
- Age: 11 to 18
- Enrolment: 841
- Capacity: 1287
- Website: www.renfrewhighschool.com

Renfrew High School is a state-run secondary school in Renfrew, Renfrewshire, Scotland. The school roll in the 2022-23 season was 841. The headteacher since October 2023 is Mr Andrew Sutherland.

== History ==
The headteacher when the school opened in 1908 was John Irving. Formerly, the school was based in the building that now houses Trinity High School, and when it was opened in 1908 it was known as Glebe High Public School, but, due to expansion, a purpose-built premises was designed close to the initial building, and the original building became a Catholic school. The School became known as Renfrew High School from August 1927.

A fire broke out at the school in October 2016 causing significant damage to the school grounds.

== Description ==
In an inspection report of May 2018, Education Scotland described the school. They found the school was good; the headteachers gave strong leadership of school improvement, and his work with staff to embed a positive culture which benefits all young people. There was very effective use of information about young people’s wellbeing which ensured that their needs were well met, and that they make good progress. There was a very positive environment for pupil support especially those with additional needs. This and the commitment of all the staff to promoting 'nurturing and inclusive relationships' across the school, led to improved outcomes for all young people. The inspectors noticed improvement in the proportion of young people achieving a range of Higher passes in S5 and S6.

== Notable alumni ==
Former pupils and teachers include the poet Douglas Dunn, a close associate of Philip Larkin at Hull University, who lived in Inchinnan and attended Renfrew High School in the 1950s, Mitchell Lawrie, the Youth Darts Player, and the composer Alan Fleming-Baird, SNP politician Derek Mackay also attended the school. Former Rangers Footballer Andy Halliday also went to Renfrew High as well.
