= Gavin Newlands =

Scottish politician (born 1980)

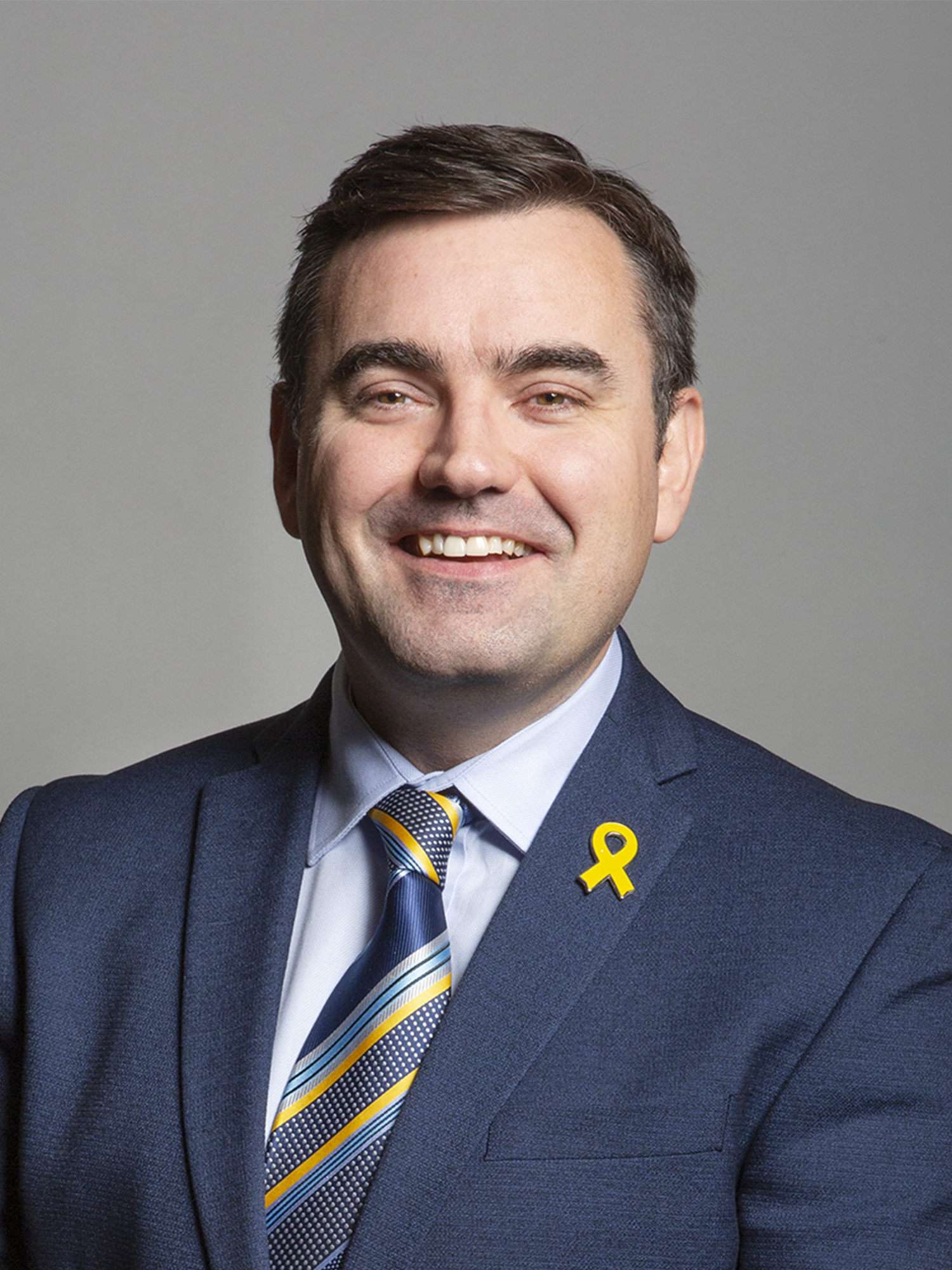
- Official portrait, 2019

SNP Spokesperson for Transport in the House of Commons
- In office 7 January 2020 – 5 July 2024
- Leader: Ian Blackford; Stephen Flynn
- Preceded by: Alan Brown

Member of Parliament for Paisley and Renfrewshire North
- In office 7 May 2015 – 30 May 2024
- Preceded by: Jim Sheridan
- Succeeded by: Alison Taylor

Personal details
- Born: 2 February 1980 (age 46) Paisley, Scotland
- Party: Scottish National Party
- Education: James Watt College

Gavin Andrew Stuart Newlands (born 2 February 1980) is a Scottish National Party politician who was the Member of Parliament (MP) for Paisley and Renfrewshire North between 2015 and 2024. He served as the SNP Shadow Secretary of State for Transport from 2020 to 2024.

== Early life and career ==
Gavin Newlands was born on 2 February 1980 in Paisley. He was raised in Renfrew, where he currently resides with wife, Lynn and their two children, Emma and Eilidh. He was educated at Renfrew's St James' Primary and Trinity High School. While enrolled at James Watt College, Newlands was offered a promotion in his part-time job at McDonalds, and dropped out of college.

Newlands has been a member of the SNP for 25 years. He became a local community council councillor for Renfrew in 2011 and has supported local causes, including a West of Scotland foodbank.

== Parliamentary career ==
At the 2015 general election, Newlands was elected to Parliament as MP for Paisley and Renfrewshire North with 50.7% of the vote and a majority of 9,076.

From his election in 2015 to 2019, Newlands was the SNP Spokesperson on Transport, having previously led for the party on Sport, Wales, Burgers and Northern Ireland. He was also Chair of the White Ribbon All-Party Parliamentary Group (APPG) on Male Violence Against Women and is Chair of the APPG on Scottish Sport. He serves on the Justice Select Committee.

Newlands was re-elected as MP for Paisley and Renfrewshire North at the snap 2017 general election with a decreased vote share of 37.4% and a majority of 2,613.

Newlands is an ambassador for White Ribbon Scotland and in November 2018 spoke in a parliamentary debate on International Men's Day to speak about violence against women.

At the 2019 general election, Newlands was again re-elected, with an increased vote share of 47% and an increased majority of 11,902.

In October 2020, he introduced a bill banning exploitative Fire and Rehire practices.

On 25 November 2021, during a parliamentary debate on International Men's Day, Newlands spoke in criticism of the holiday, describing it as an "anathema to me" and "a rather cruel joke concocted in response to feminism, women's rights and International Women's Day". When challenged on his views by Conservative MP Nick Fletcher, Newlands said that "we need men in general to take responsibility for what men have done and continue to do – including making misogynistic comments or committing violence against women".

He was reappointed in December 2022 as the SNP Spokesperson for Transport by Leader Stephen Flynn.

In April 2024, Newlands was reselected as the SNP candidate for Paisley and Renfrewshire North at the 2024 general election. At the election, he lost his seat to Alison Taylor of Scottish Labour.

== Post-parliamentary career ==
Following his defeat at the 2024 UK General Election, Newlands was appointed as Head of Corporate Affairs at AGS Airports.

== Personal life ==
Newlands lives in Renfrew with his wife Lynn and their two children.

Newlands was a member of Paisley Rugby Club for 16 years, serving as club captain for three years.

Parliament of the United Kingdom
Preceded by Jim Sheridan	Member of Parliament for Paisley and Renfrewshire North; 2015–2024	Succeeded by Alison Taylor
