= Jim Sheridan (politician) =

British politician (1952–2022)

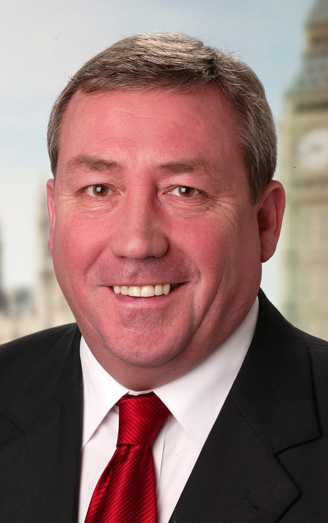
- Sheridan as an MP

Member of Parliament for Paisley and Renfrewshire North Renfrewshire West (2001–2005)
- In office 7 June 2001 – 30 March 2015
- Preceded by: Thomas Graham
- Succeeded by: Gavin Newlands

Personal details
- Born: 24 November 1952 Glasgow, Scotland
- Died: 23 September 2022 (aged 69)
- Party: Labour
- Spouse: Jean Sheridan
- Children: 2

James Sheridan (24 November 1952 – 23 September 2022) was a British Labour Party politician who was Member of Parliament (MP) for Paisley and Renfrewshire North, formerly Renfrewshire West, from 2001 to 2015.

== Early life ==
Sheridan was born in Glasgow and attended St Sixtus Primary School and St Pius Secondary School in Drumchapel (now the location of Drumchapel High School). Before entering politics he worked in shipyards from 1970 to 1978, then as a printer for the Paisley Daily Express from 1978 to 1984, then for Thales Optronics (formerly Barr and Stroud before 2001) in Glasgow, where he was a trade union convenor for the TGWU from 1984 to 2000. He also served on Renfrewshire Council from 1999 representing Erskine Central.

== Parliamentary career ==
He was previously MP for Renfrewshire West from the 2001 election until the constituency was abolished in 2005. Sheridan was the promoter of the Bill which led to the Gangmasters (Licensing) Act 2004.

Following the 2005 election, he was appointed a Parliamentary Private Secretary in the Ministry of Defence. He resigned this post on 9 August 2006 in protest at the Government's policy on the 2006 Israel-Lebanon conflict, particularly the permitting of aircraft carrying US weapons for Israel to refuel in the UK. He was a strong supporter of Speaker of the House Michael Martin, at the time of the second-home expenses scandal, for instance stating that Martin did not know about the expenses claims of MPs on Radio 4's Today programme (18 May 2009).

In November 2008, Sheridan tabled a Commons early day motion backing a Great Britain football team at the 2012 Olympics, saying football "should not be any different from other competing sports and our young talent should be allowed to show their skills on the world stage". The football governing bodies of Scotland, Wales and Northern Ireland are all opposed to a Great Britain team, fearing it would stop them competing as individual nations in future tournaments.

In February 2013, Sheridan voted against the Marriage (Same Sex Couples) Act 2013, opposing the legalisation of same-sex marriage within England and Wales. The MP subsequently declined to vote during the bill’s third and final reading.

The Daily Telegraph reported in 2009 that the Labour MP claimed a 42-inch plasma TV costing £699.99, a leather bed, and thousands of pounds worth of other furniture through his parliamentary allowances. He defended his expenses as "authorised by the Fees Office and receipts were provided against all claims."

He was one of 16 signatories of an open letter to Ed Miliband in January 2015 calling on the party to commit to oppose further austerity, take rail franchises back into public ownership and strengthen collective bargaining arrangements.

== Post-parliamentary career ==
In May 2017, Sheridan was elected as a councillor for a second time, representing the Labour Party for Houston, Crosslee and Linwood ward on Renfrewshire Council.

On 18 August 2018, he was suspended from the Labour Party on a charge of antisemitism, after posting the following on Facebook: "For almost all my adult life I have had the utmost respect and empathy for the Jewish community and their historic suffering. No longer due to what they and their Blairite plotters are doing to my party and the long suffering people of Britain who need a radical Labour government." He was reinstated in February 2019 but received a reminder of party conduct. He commented: "I remain of the view that my accusers were misguided and overreacted to what was intended to highlight my personal frustration and criticism of those intent on undermining our leadership in Scotland and the UK. I would also like to reiterate my sincere apologies to the Jewish community whose historic struggle I have supported all my political life.”

In June 2019, Sheridan was made deputy leader of Renfrewshire Council's Labour group. He endorsed Monica Lennon in the 2021 Scottish Labour leadership election.

== Personal life and death ==
Sheridan lived in Erskine, Renfrewshire, with his wife Jean. They had a son and daughter.

Sheridan died following "a period of illness" on 23 September 2022, at the age of 69.

Parliament of the United Kingdom
| Preceded by Thomas Graham | Member of Parliament for Renfrewshire West; 2001–2005 | Constituency abolished |
| New constituency | Member of Parliament for Paisley and Renfrewshire North; 2005–2015 | Succeeded by Gavin Newlands |
