= Rarian =

- Developer: Don Scorgie
- Stable release: 0.8.1 / September 1, 2008
- Written in: C
- Operating system: Linux
- Type: Document cataloging
- Website: rarian.freedesktop.org

Rarian is a document cataloging system (formerly known as Spoon). It manages documentation metadata, as specified by the Open Source Metadata Framework (OMF). Rarian is used by the GNOME desktop help browser, Yelp. It has replaced ScrollKeeper, as originally designed. It provides an API.
