= Paisley and Renfrewshire North =

UK Parliament constituency (since 2005)

Coordinates: 55.860°N 4.499°W

- Burgh constituency for the House of Commons
- Paisley and Renfrewshire North shown within Scotland.
- Subdivision: Renfrewshire and Glasgow City
- Electorate: 69,941 (March 2020)
- Major settlements: Bishopton, Erskine, Renfrew

Current constituency
- Created: 2005
- Member of Parliament: Alison Taylor (Labour)
- Created from: Paisley South, Paisley North and Renfrewshire West

Paisley and Renfrewshire North is a constituency of the House of Commons of the Parliament of the United Kingdom represented since 2024 by Alison Taylor of Scottish Labour. It was created for the 2005 general election, from parts of the Paisley North and Renfrewshire West constituencies.

== Boundaries ==
Map of boundaries 2005–2024

Map of boundaries from 2024

2005–2024: Under the Fifth Review of UK Parliament constituencies, the constituency boundaries were defined in accordance with the ward structure in place on 30 November 2004. The northern boundary ran along the River Clyde from Braehead in the east to Langbank in the west. The constituency included the northern part of Paisley, plus the towns and villages of Renfrew, Erskine, Inchinnan, Bishopton, Langbank, Bridge of Weir, Houston, Craigends, Brookfield and Linwood. It also included Glasgow Airport and part of the Hillington Industrial Estate.

2024–present: Following the completion of the 2023 review of Westminster constituencies, the seat underwent significant boundary changes which were used for the first time at the 2024 general election. The redrawn constituency contains a northern portion of Renfrewshire, including part of Paisley and the towns of Renfrew, Erskine and Bishopton alongside the villages of Inchinnan and Langbank in full. It also adds the entire Hillington and part of the Cardonald area of Glasgow. Linwood and Brookfield were moved to Paisley and Renfrewshire South and Bridge of Weir, Houston and Craigends included in the new Inverclyde and Renfrewshire West constituency.

The seat is defined as comprising the following:

- In full: the Renfrewshire Council wards of Renfrew North and Braehead, Renfrew South and Gallowhill, Paisley Northeast and Ralston, Erskine and Inchinnan.
- In part: the Renfrewshire Council wards of Paisley Northwest (northern areas comprising about 45% of the electorate), Houston, Crosslee and Linwood (very small part), Bishopton, Bridge of Weir and Langbank (northern areas including Bishopton and Langbank); and the Glasgow City Council ward of Cardonald (northern parts including the districts of North Cardonald, Hillington, Penilee and Rosshall).

== Members of Parliament ==
Election	Member	Party
2005	Jim Sheridan	Labour
2015	Gavin Newlands	SNP
2024	Alison Taylor	Labour

== Elections ==
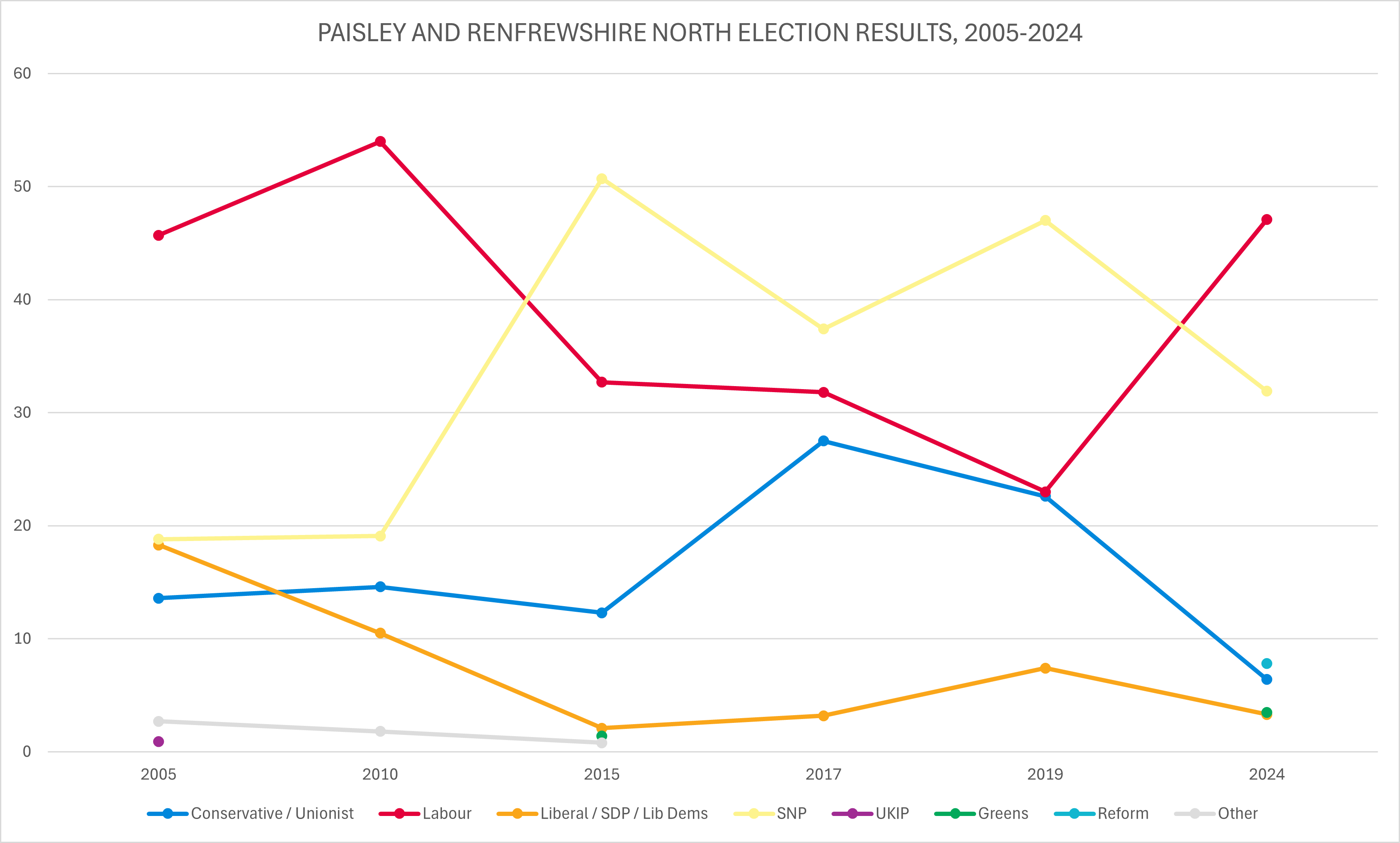
Election results 2005-2024

=== Elections in the 2020s ===
General election 2024: Paisley and Renfrewshire North
Party	Candidate	Votes	%	±%
Labour	Alison Taylor	19,561	47.1	+23.4
SNP	Gavin Newlands	13,228	31.9	−17.0
Reform	Andrew Scott	3,228	7.8	+7.5
Conservative	David McGonigle	2,659	6.4	−13.1
Green	Jen Bell	1,469	3.5	New
Liberal Democrats	Grant Toghill	1,374	3.3	−4.3
Majority		6,333	15.2	N/A
Turnout		41,519	58.4	−8.5
Registered electors		71,103		
Labour gain from SNP		Swing	+20.2	

=== Elections in the 2010s ===
2019 notional result (Note: Estimate of the 2019 general election result as if the revised boundaries recommended under the 2023 boundary review were in place)
Party	Vote	%
SNP	22,856	48.9
Labour	11,103	23.7
Conservative	9,134	19.5
Liberal Democrats	3,539	7.6
Brexit Party	146	0.3
Majority	11,753	25.1
Turnout	46,778	66.9
Electorate	69,941	

General election 2019: Paisley and Renfrewshire North
Party	Candidate	Votes	%	±%
SNP	Gavin Newlands	23,353	47.0	+9.6
Labour	Alison Taylor	11,451	23.0	−8.8
Conservative	Julie Pirone	11,217	22.6	−4.9
Liberal Democrats	Ross Stalker	3,661	7.4	+4.2
Majority		11,902	24.0	+18.4
Turnout		49,682	69.0	−0.1
SNP hold		Swing	+9.2	

General election 2017: Paisley and Renfrewshire North
Party	Candidate	Votes	%	±%
SNP	Gavin Newlands	17,455	37.4	−13.3
Labour	Alison Taylor	14,842	31.8	−0.9
Conservative	David Gardiner	12,842	27.5	+15.2
Liberal Democrats	John Boyd	1,476	3.2	+1.1
Majority		2,613	5.6	−12.4
Turnout		46,615	69.1	−7.1
SNP hold		Swing	−6.2	

General election 2015: Paisley and Renfrewshire North
Party	Candidate	Votes	%	±%
SNP	Gavin Newlands	25,601	50.7	+31.6
Labour	Jim Sheridan	16,525	32.7	−21.3
Conservative	John Anderson	6,183	12.3	−2.3
Liberal Democrats	James Speirs	1,055	2.1	−8.4
Green	Ryan Morrison	703	1.4	New
CISTA	Andy Doyle	202	0.4	New
TUSC	Jim Halfpenny	193	0.4	New
Majority		9,076	18.0	N/A
Turnout		50,462	76.2	+7.6
SNP gain from Labour		Swing	+26.5	

General election 2010: Paisley and Renfrewshire North
Party	Candidate	Votes	%	±%
Labour	Jim Sheridan	23,613	54.0	+8.3
SNP	Mags MacLaren	8,333	19.1	+0.3
Conservative	Alistair Campbell	6,381	14.6	+1.0
Liberal Democrats	Ruaraidh Dobson	4,597	10.5	−7.8
Independent	Gary Pearson	550	1.3	New
Scottish Socialist	Chris Rollo	233	0.5	−1.1
Majority		15,280	34.9	+8.0
Turnout		43,707	68.6	+3.8
Labour hold		Swing	+4.3	

=== Elections in the 2000s ===
General election 2005: Paisley and Renfrewshire North
Party	Candidate	Votes	%	±%
Labour	Jim Sheridan	18,697	45.7	−6.6
SNP	Bill Wilson	7,696	18.8	−3.9
Liberal Democrats	Lewis Hutton	7,464	18.3	+10.7
Conservative	Philip Lardner	5,566	13.6	−0.1
Scottish Socialist	Angela McGregor	646	1.6	−1.7
Socialist Labour	Katharine McGavigan	444	1.1	New
UKIP	John Pearson	372	0.9	New
Majority		11,001	26.9	−2.7
Turnout		40,885	64.8	+3.6
Labour hold		Swing	−1.3	
