= Metadata standard =

Concept in data management

A metadata standard is a requirement which is intended to establish a common understanding of the meaning or semantics of the data, to ensure correct and proper use and interpretation of the data by its owners and users. To achieve this common understanding, a number of characteristics, or attributes of the data have to be defined, also known as metadata.

== Metadata ==
Metadata is often defined as data about data. It is “structured information that describes, explains, locates, or otherwise makes it easier to retrieve, use or manage an information resource”, especially in a distributed network environment like for example the internet or an organization. A good example of metadata is the cataloging system found in libraries, which records for example the author, title, subject, and location on the shelf of a resource. Another is software system knowledge extraction of software objects such as data flows, control flows, call maps, architectures, business rules, business terms, and database schemas.

Metadata is usually categorized in three types:

- Descriptive metadata describes an information resource for identification and retrieval through elements such as title, author, and abstract.
- Structural metadata documents relationships within and among objects through elements such as links to other components (e.g., how pages are put together to form chapters).
- Administrative metadata helps to manage information resources through elements such as version number, archiving date, and other technical information for purposes of file management, rights management and preservation.

== Available metadata standards ==
Metadata elements grouped into sets designed for a specific purpose, e.g., for a specific domain or a particular type of information resource, are called metadata schemas. For every element the name and the semantics (the meaning of the element) are specified. Content rules (how content must be formulated), representation rules (e.g., capitalization rules), and allowed element values (e.g., from a controlled vocabulary) can be specified optionally. Some schemas also specify in which syntax the elements must be encoded, in contrast to syntax independent schemas. Many current schemas use Standard Generalized Markup Language (SGML) or XML to specify their syntax. Metadata schemas that are developed and maintained by standard organizations (such as ISO) or organizations that have taken on such responsibility (such as the Dublin Core Metadata Initiative) are called metadata standards.

Many different metadata schemas are being developed as standards across disciplines, such as library science, education, archiving, e-commerce, and arts. In the table below, an overview of available metadata standards is given.

Name	Focus	Description
DDI	Archiving and Social Science	The Data Documentation Initiative is an international effort to establish a standard for technical documentation describing social science data. A membership-based Alliance is developing the DDI specification, which is written in XML.
EBUCore	The EBUCore metadata set for audiovisual content	EBUCore is a set of descriptive and technical metadata based on the Dublin Core and adapted to media. EBUCore is the flagship metadata specification of EBU, the largest professional association of broadcasters around the world. It is developed and maintained by EBU's Technical Department. EBU has a long history in the definition of metadata solutions for broadcasters. EBUCore is largely used as shown in this report. EBUCore is registered in SMPTE. It is also available in RDF.
EBU CCDM	The EBU Class Conceptual Data Model - CCDM	The EBU Class Conceptual Data Model (CCDM) is an ontology defining a basic set of Classes and properties as a common vocabulary to describe programmes in their different phases of creation from commissioning to delivery. CCDM is a common framework and users are invited to further enrich the model with Classes and properties fitting more specifically their needs.
FOAF	Friend of a Friend (FOAF)	The Friend of a Friend (FOAF) project is about creating a Web of machine-readable homepages describing people, the links between them and the things they create and do.
EAD	Archiving	Encoded Archival Description is a standard for encoding archival finding aids using XML in archival and manuscript repositories.
CDWA	Arts	Categories for the Description of Works of Art is a conceptual framework for describing and accessing information about works of art, architecture, and other material culture.
VRA Core	Arts	Visual Resources Association provides a categorical organization for the description of works of visual culture as well as the images that document them.
Darwin Core	Biology	The Darwin Core is a metadata specification for information about the geographic occurrence of species and the existence of specimens in collections.
ONIX	Book industry	Online Information Exchange is an international standard for representing and communicating book industry product information in electronic form.
CWM	Data warehousing	The main purpose of the Common Warehouse Metamodel is to enable easy interchange of warehouse and business intelligence metadata in distributed heterogeneous environments.
EML	Ecology	Ecological Metadata Language is a specification developed for the ecology discipline.
IEEE LOM	Education	Learning Objects Metadata specifies the syntax and semantics of Learning Object Metadata.
CSDGM	Geographic data	Content Standard for Digital Geospatial Metadata is maintained by the Federal Geographic Data Committee (FGDC).
ISO 19115	Geographic data	The ISO 19115:2003 Geographic information — Metadata standard defines how to describe geographical information and associated services, including contents, spatial-temporal purchases, data quality, access and rights to use. It is maintained by the ISO/TC 211 committee.
e-GMS	Government	The e-Government Metadata Standard (E-GMS) defines the metadata elements for information resources to ensure maximum consistency of metadata across public sector organizations in the UK.
GILS	Government/organizations	The Global Information Locator Service defines an open, low-cost, and scalable standard so that governments, companies, or other organizations can help searchers find information.
TEI	Humanities, social sciences and linguistics	Text Encoding Initiative is a standard for the representation of texts in digital form, chiefly in the humanities, social sciences and linguistics.
NISO MIX	Images	Z39.87 Data dictionary is technical metadata for digital still images (MIX) – NISO Metadata for Images in XML is an XML schema for a set of technical data elements required to manage digital image collections.
<indecs>	Intellectual property	Indecs Content Model – Interoperability of Data in E-Commerce Systems addresses the need to put different creation identifiers and metadata into a framework to support the management of intellectual property rights.
MARC	Librarianship	MARC - MAchine Readable Cataloging – standards for the representation and communication of bibliographic and related information in machine-readable form.
METS	Librarianship	Metadata Encoding and Transmission Standard is an XML schema for encoding descriptive, administrative, and structural metadata regarding objects within a digital library.
MODS	Librarianship	Metadata Object Description Schema is a schema for a bibliographic element set that may be used for a variety of purposes, and particularly for library applications.
MADS	Librarianship	Metadata Authority Description Schema is a schema for authority control that may be used for a variety of purposes, especially managing names of people, organization, or geographical areas, and particularly for library applications.
XOBIS	Librarianship	XML Organic Bibliographic Information Schema is an XML schema for modeling MARC data.
PBCore	Media	PBCore is a metadata and cataloging resource for public broadcasters and associated communities.
MPEG-7	Multimedia	The Multimedia Content Description Interface MPEG-7 is an ISO/IEC standard and specifies a set of descriptors to describe various types of multimedia information; it is developed by the Moving Picture Experts Group.
MEI	Music notation	Music Encoding Initiative is a community-driven effort to create a commonly accepted, digital, symbolic representation of music notation documents.
Dublin Core	Networked resources	Dublin Core – interoperable online metadata standard focused on networked resources.
DOI	Networked resources	Digital Object Identifier provides a system for the identification and hence management of information ("content") on digital networks, providing persistence and semantic interoperability.
ISO/IEC 11179	Organizations	ISO/IEC 11179 Standard describes the metadata and activities needed to manage data elements in a registry to create a common understanding of data across organizational elements and between organizations.
ISO/IEC 19506	Software Systems	ISO/IEC 19506 Standard called Knowledge Discovery Metamodel is an ontology for describing software systems. The standard provides both a detailed ontology and common data format for representing granular software objects and their relationships enabling the extractions such as data flows, control flows, call maps, architecture, database schemas, business rules/terms and the derivation of business processes. Used primarily for legacy and existing systems security, compliance and modernization.
ISO 23081	Records management	ISO 23081 is a three-part technical specification defining metadata needed to manage records. Part 1 addresses principles, part 2 addresses conceptual and implementation issues, and part 3 outlines a self-assessment method.
MoReq2010	Records management	MoReq2010 is a specification describing the MOdel REQuirements for the management of electronic records.
DIF	Scientific data sets	Directory Interchange Format is a descriptive and standardized format for exchanging information about scientific data sets.
RAD	Librarianship and archiving	The Rules for Archival Description (RAD) is the Canadian archival descriptive standard. It is overseen by the Canadian Committee on Archival Description of the Canadian Council of Archives. Similar in structure to AACR2, it was last revised in 2008.
RDF	Web resources	Resource Description Framework (RDF) is a general method for conceptual description or modeling of information that is implemented in web resources, using a variety of syntax formats.
MDDL	Financial market	The (Financial) Market Data Definition Language (MDDL) has been developed by the Financial Information Services Division (FISD) of the Software and Information Industry Association (SIIA). MDDL is an extensible Markup Language (XML) derived specification, which facilitates the interchange of information about financial instruments used throughout the world financial markets. MDDL helps in mapping all market data into a common language and structure to ease the interchange and processing of multiple complex data sets.
NIEM	Law enforcement; Social services; Enterprise resource planning	NIEM – the National Information Exchange Model – is a community-driven, US government-wide, standards-based approach to exchanging information. NIEM's data domains are growing standards developed and maintained by domain communities. Some sample domains included or being developed in NIEM are: chemistry/biology/radiation/nuclear; justice; intelligence; immigration; international trade; biometrics; emergency management; screening; human services; children, youth, and family services; health; infrastructure protection; military operations; maritime; and surface transportation.
SAML	Shibboleth has been evolved by Internet2/MACE. It provides a method of distributed authentication and authorization for participating HTTP(S) based applications.	Security Assertion Markup Language is an XML-based open standard data format for exchanging authentication and authorization data between parties. A schema example can be found on OASIS (Advancing open standards for the information society)

== See also ==
- Data dictionary – Set of metadata that contains definitions and representations of data elements
- Metadata – Data about other data
- Metamodeling – Concept of software engineering
- Metadata registry – Central location to store metadata
- BioSharing - registry of standards in the life sciences
