= Geotek =

Geotek Limited.
- Type: Private limited company by shares
- Founded: 1994
- Headquarters: Daventry, UK
- Products: Core Logging Equipment
- Website: https://www.geotek.co.uk

Geotek is a UK company that designs and manufactures specialised geological and oceanographic equipment.

== Company history ==
Founded by Peter Schultheiss in 1989, Geotek was incorporated in 1994 when Quentin Huggett joined as a company director and the business moved from Haslemere, Surrey to its current location in Daventry, Northamptonshire where John Roberts joined as Technical Director.

The company supplies of equipment for the automated analysis of sediment and rock cores. The Multi-Sensor Core Logger has been sold and contracted to universities, institutions and survey companies who use the instrument for applications including studies of climate change , offshore site investigation and oil, gas and minerals exploration.

The company also specifies and manages marine environmental surveys of the seafloor and managed the Strategic Environmental Assessment for Oil and Gas and Renewable Energy for the Department of Trade and Industry. This was the UK's first fully online Government consultation process.

In recent years Geotek developed pressure core analysis, particularly for the study of gas hydrates, and has worked in a number of gas hydrate investigations funded by national governments.

== Products ==
The Geotek Multi-Sensor Core Logger (MSCL) is non-destructive core logging equipment that can work with both whole round and split cores of both hard rocks and soft sediments. The MSCL systems enable a number of geophysical measurements to be obtained automatically on sediment or rock cores under a variety of conditions.

== Awards ==
- Queen's Award for Export in 2000
