= PHP License =

Software license under which the PHP scripting language is released

- Latest version: 4.0
- Publisher: The PHP Group
- Published: May 2026
- SPDX identifier: BSD-3-Clause
- Debian FSG compatible: No
- FSF approved: Yes
- OSI approved: Yes
- GPL compatible: Yes
- Copyleft: No
- Website: www.php.net/license/

The PHP License is the open-source license under which the PHP scripting language is released. The PHP License is designed to encourage widespread adoption of the source code. Redistribution is permitted in source or binary form with or without modifications, with some caveats.

Beginning with PHP version 8.6 in 2026, the PHP and Zend licences are reduced to three clauses and they become equivalent to the 3-clause BSD license. This change made the licences GPL compatible. According to the old licenses' clause 4 or 5, one can use any PHP license under newer terms which backdated PHP to be GPL compatible now.

== Earlier versions ==
Version 3 of PHP used a dual license—PHP 3's source is available under either the PHP License or the GNU General Public License (GPL). This practice was discontinued as of PHP 4, with PHP's developers citing the restrictions on reuse associated with the GPL's copyleft enforcement as being the reason for dropping it. The Zend Engine, the core of the PHP interpreter, is separately licensed under the similar Zend Engine License, which contains similar naming restrictions to the PHP license (applying to the names "Zend" and "Zend Engine"), and a clause requiring advertising materials to mention its use.

=== Criticism of early versions ===
Version 3 of the PHP License is an open source license according to the Open Source Initiative, and a non-copyleft free software license according to the Free Software Foundation. The license is GPL-incompatible due to restrictions on the usage of the term PHP.

Debian maintainers have had a long-standing discussion (since at least 2005) about the validity of the PHP license. Expressed concerns include that the license "contains statements about the software it covers that are specific to distributing PHP itself", which, for other software than PHP itself therefore would be "false statements".

Debian has a specific policy for the license (and requires a statement in debian/copyright file when it is used): "The PHP license must only be used for PHP and PHP add-ons."

== See also ==
- Apache License
- Software using the PHP license (category)
