= Government Category List =

The United Kingdom Government Category List (GCL) was a type of controlled vocabulary called a taxonomy, for use in choosing Subject metadata and keywords, primarily for indexing government web pages. The use of GCL terms in the metadata of all government resources is intended to facilitate, encourage and simplify automatic categorisation. The Government Category list was superseded by the Integrated Public Sector Vocabulary (IPSV) during 2006, which incorporates terms from GCL as well as from other controlled vocabularies, and is designed to enable semantic interoperability of systems and web resources across the UK public sector.
