= Chartered surveyors in the United Kingdom =

A Chartered surveyor in the United Kingdom is a surveyor who is a member of the Royal Institution of Chartered Surveyors ("RICS"). Until the end of the 20th century, some members were members of the ISVA ("Incorporated Society of Valuers and Auctioneers"), but this organisation merged into the RICS in 1999.

In the reforms of the RICS in the 1990s, the former divisional structure of the institution was abolished and the use of the alternative designations retained solely for the use of members to retain clarification when informing clients of specialist areas of expertise. Despite the attempt to unify the profession under one title chartered surveyor there is very little in common across the whole range of disciplines that are within the grasp of all members. The core membership is based in the construction profession, and another large sector deal with property ownership and management. Beyond these cores there are marine, land, rural and antiques specialists.

Chartered surveyors in the core of the profession may offer mortgage valuations, homebuyer's survey and valuations, full building surveys, building surveyors' services, quantity surveying, land surveying, auctioneering, estate management and other forms of survey- and building-related advice. It is not usual for any individual member to have expertise in all areas, so partnerships or companies are established to create practices that can offer a wider spectrum of surveying services.

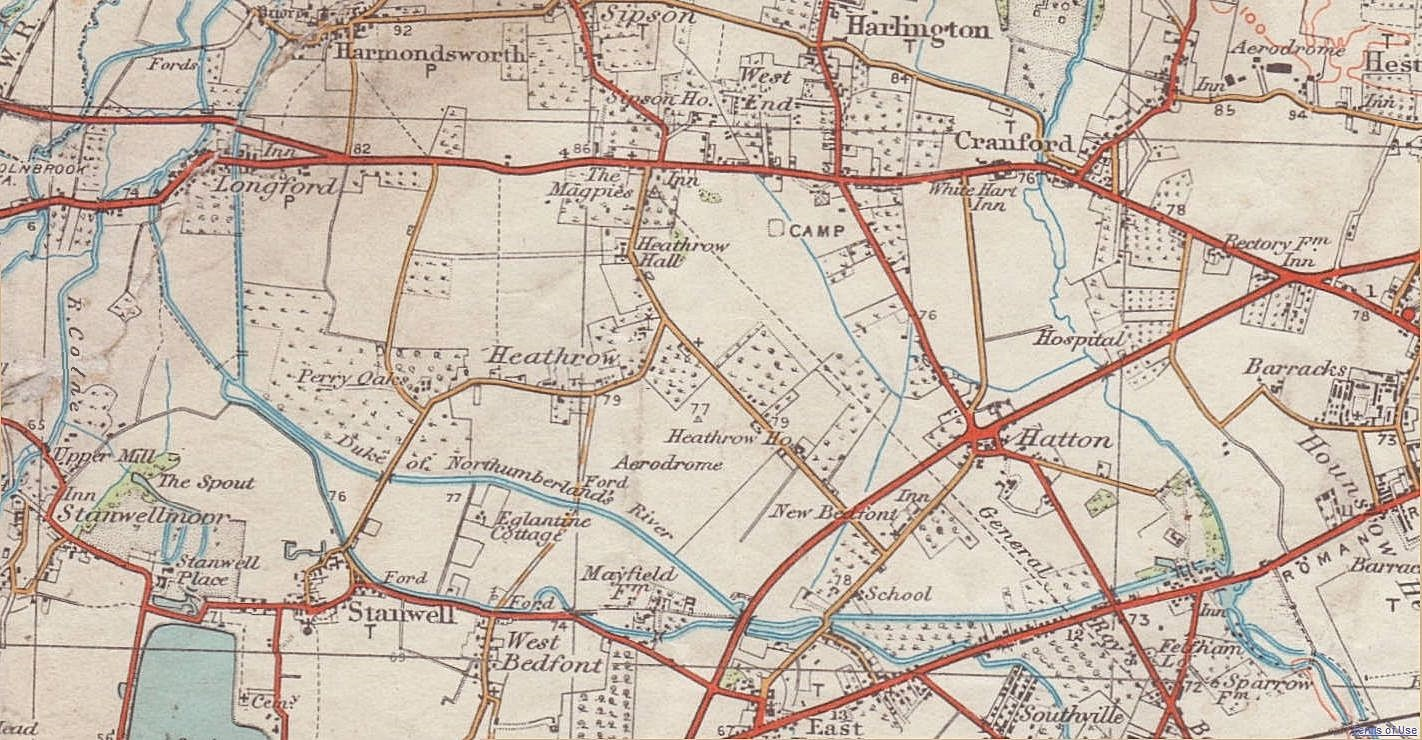
An old Ordnance survey map

== Real estate valuation in the UK ==
The common public experience of chartered surveyors is in the process of obtaining a mortgage loan. The surveyor is appointed by the lender. The mortgage loan will rarely be granted unless the surveyor confirms that the property is good security for a loan and worth the price to be agreed.

=== Types of survey ===
Typically, chartered surveyors can be engaged in three types of real estate survey.

A mortgage valuation will be required by any mortgage lender as a condition of obtaining a mortgage loan. The homebuyer might instruct the same surveyor to carry out a "RICS HomeBuyer Report" or a "RICS Building Survey" (sometimes called a "Structural Survey"), usually at additional cost. When the surveyor is instructed in this combined role, the mortgage valuation is still produced for the lender, and an additional HomeBuyer Report or Building Survey is prepared for the borrower. This arrangement avoids the potential conflict of interest where the surveyor has as client both the lender and the borrower in the transaction.

The Council of Mortgage Lenders recommends that buyers should not rely only on the mortgage valuation, but obtain a fuller survey for their own purposes. However, a fuller survey is rarely a condition of the loan.

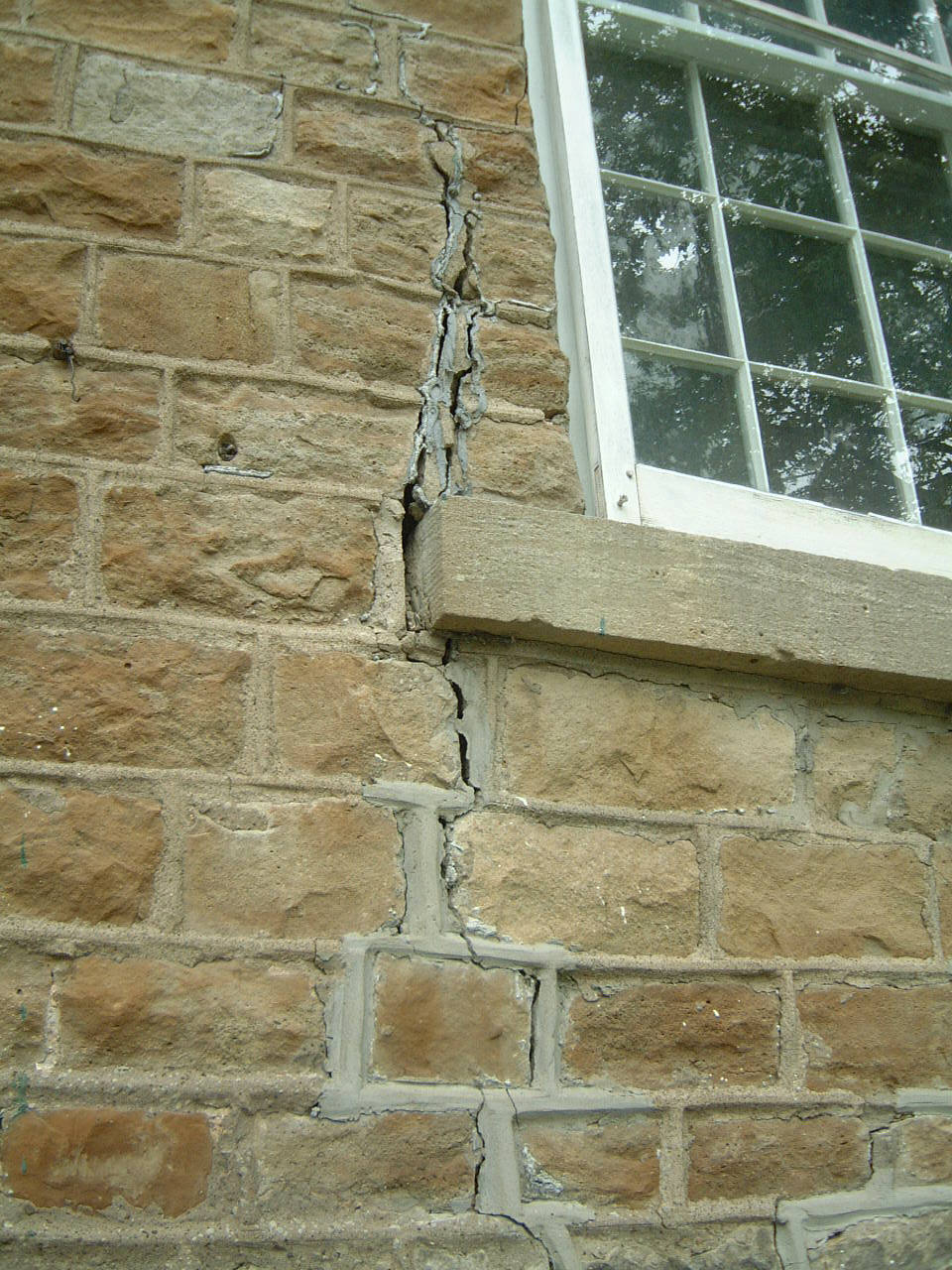
A structural defect

The borrower may prefer to select an independent surveyor to undertake the HomeBuyer Report or Building Survey.

==== Mortgage valuation report ====
A mortgage valuation is for the benefit of the lender. Its purpose is merely to confirm the property is suitable security and worth the price paid, in order to protect the lender's interests. Invariably there is a disclaimer on the report that confirms that the surveyor extends no responsibility to the borrower. This is a legally valid exclusion.

==== RICS Condition Report ====
This is short report that describes the visual condition of nine external elements of construction, nine internal elements of construction, seven services supplied to the building, and three key components of the grounds in which the property is sited. The reports rates conditions from 1 - good, 2, - needing attention in the near future, 3 - needing attention now using a traffic light system to draw attention to things that matter.

==== RICS HomeBuyer Report ====
This format is best suited to traditionally built houses without major alterations or extensions. This report is much longer than the condition report and looks in more detail at the property to report on the visual condition and maintenance needs of nine external elements of construction, nine internal elements of construction, seven services supplied to the building, and three key components of the grounds in which the property is sited. The reports rates conditions from 1 - good, 2, - needing attention in the near future, 3 - needing attention now using a traffic light system to draw attention to things that matter. The report also includes commentary to advise your solicitor on issues that need addressing in the conveyance, and any risks that affect the building, grounds and people of a more general nature. There is also a market valuation of the property and an assessment of rebuilding costs for insurance purposes.

==== RICS Building Survey ====
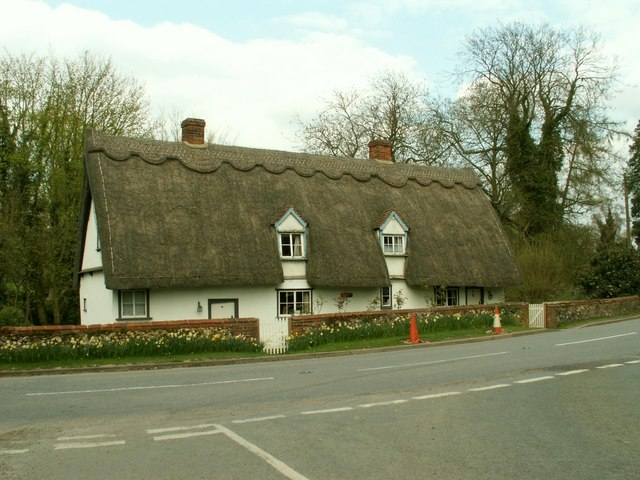
A thatched cottage

There are a number of variations to a residential building survey which offers the home purchaser a choice of products. The two main variants are the RICS Guidance note version stemming from the earlier RICS guidance note 2004 (more recently updated by the "Surveys of residential property RICS guidance note 3rd edition" which was introduced in December 2013). The primary difference between guidance note and the practice note for the consumer is the format of the reports. A bespoke style or a framework (traffic light signal) style. For surveyors guidance is "best practice" and practice note is "mandatory".

The guidance note version can be provided in an agreed word document style format with an appendix for photographs etc. There is also a choice (at extra commissioning cost) to add a market valuation and other services such as costing for repairs and project management / further investigation services by agreement as cited at the end of this description. In effect, is a fully bespoke report.

The alternative is the practice note version (introduced to the market in November 2012). It is a similar traffic light signal format as the other RICS survey products such as the RICS condition report and the RICS homebuyer reports.

Both report formats (guidance note and practice note versions) are appropriate for virtually all properties, including but not limited to listed buildings, thatched cottages, timber frame homes and so on.

The building survey is the most detailed survey available from most firms of Chartered Surveyors. Thorough though it is, it may still lead to recommendations for further investigation from other specialists; see below. The building survey report is much longer than the condition report but may not be much longer than the homebuyer report as its content depends on the condition observed in each individual case. The practice note version building survey looks in more detail at the property to report on the visual condition and maintenance needs of nine external elements of construction, with scope for sub-division into individual features, with the nine internal elements of construction and the seven services supplied to the building examined in a similar manner. Also the three key components of the grounds in which the property is sited can be subdivided as necessary.

The practice note version of the report also rates conditions from 1 - good, 2, - needing attention in the near future, 3 - needing attention now using a traffic light system to draw attention to things that matter. In this format, if there is a defect, not only will it be identified but its causes analyzed and methods of repair and elimination of the cause discussed in some detail. The report also includes commentary to advise your solicitor on issues that need addressing in the conveyance, and any risks that affect the building, grounds and people of a more general nature. There is also discussion on the means of escape in case of fire, which in older houses in particular can be compromised by poor design and alterations. There is no market valuation or an assessment of rebuilding costs for insurance purposes in the document. These can be added, along with cost estimates for the repairs by a separate agreement as discussed in the helpful RICS explanatory notes to clients.

Collectively, a key feature of RICS building surveys are that they provide an opportunity for clients and surveyors to strike up a detailed dialogue about the property they are intending to purchase. Purchasers find a building survey useful in allowing for further negotiations on price or for providing a clients briefing document for extensions or repairs. The building survey is a very interactive process.

==== Energy performance certificate ====
Chartered surveyors can also provide an energy performance certificate.

=== Limits ===
Chartered Surveyors are not necessarily specialists in other fields, and may recommend further investigations by an electrician, a gas engineer, a structural engineer or expert of another kind, depending on what they find during their inspection. They may also recommend work by the buyer's solicitor to confirm matters which might affect their valuation, such as (with leasehold properties), the unexpired term of the lease, who is responsible for the boundaries, and so forth.

The Chartered Surveyor's inspection is typically non-intrusive. They do not have the authority to lift floorboards, drill holes, or perform excavations at a property which the prospective buyer does not, at this stage, own, which means that certain defects or problems may not be apparent from their inspection.

== Building surveying ==
As well as surveying, building surveyors in the UK give advice on design, construction, maintenance and repair. They may also assess damage or dilapidations on behalf of an insurance company.

Fully qualified building surveyors in the UK can be members of the RICS, CIOB or CABE.

== Quantity surveying ==
Quantity surveyors work for private and commercial clients, main contractors and subcontractors in the construction industry. Their function is management of the commercial interfaces of construction: writing, negotiating, awarding and administering contracts, including variations and claims arising during the performance of a contract; cost control and cost engineering, i.e. to document and estimate costs, progress, and risks. In the UK, not all quantity surveyors are necessarily chartered surveyors; some may be chartered through the Chartered Institute of Building ("CIOB").

Additional duties may include performing feasibility studies, preparing tenders, procuring materials, managing subcontractors, and even advice on taxation or building management. Surveyors may also be involved in dispute resolution.

Quantity surveyors sometimes act as project managers of a construction site.

== Land surveying ==
Essentially, land surveying is making accurate maps and plans. Land surveying encompasses cadastral surveying, cartography, engineering surveying, hydrographic surveying and oceanographic surveying. Land surveyors may be accredited by the RICS, Chartered Institute of Building (CIOB), or the Institution of Civil Engineering Surveyors (ICES), but only RICS members can call themselves "chartered land surveyors".

== Auctioneering ==
Firms of chartered surveyors sometimes act in property auctions.

== Other aspects of surveying practice ==
As well as the services mentioned above, UK chartered surveyors may offer advice in boundary disputes, business rates, compulsory purchase matters and party walls. ("Party walls" in the UK are walls on your property shared with your neighbours.)
