= Phalanger (compiler) =

PHP compiler

- Stable release: 3.0.0.3851 / January 2013; 13 years ago
- Written in: C#, C++/CIL
- Operating system: Cross-platform
- Platform: .NET Framework
- License: Apache License (Apache 2)
- Website: www.php-compiler.net
- Repository: github.com/devsense/phalanger

Phalanger is a compiler front end for compiling PHP source code into CIL byte-code, which can be further processed by the .NET Framework's just-in-time compiler. The project was started at Charles University and is supported by Microsoft. Phalanger was discontinued in favor of the more modern PeachPie compiler, which utilizes the Roslyn API.

== Compatibility ==
Phalanger can run real-world PHP applications, many with minor to no modifications. Examples include WordPress, phpMyAdmin and phpBB.

== Performance ==
One of the main goals of the project is to improve performance of PHP applications. The project web page claims considerable performance benefits over a 32-bit Windows version of PHP.

There was a project at Charles University to re-implement the Phalanger core using the Microsoft Dynamic Language Runtime (DLR), and to develop a Visual Studio integration tool to provide IntelliSense for the PHP language.

Though some features from DLR would slow down the performance of Phalanger, they do claim performance gains by a factor of 6. These features are being integrated into current Phalanger core.

== Google Summer of Code ==
A project involving Phalanger was mentored by the Mono team during the Google Summer of Code program in 2008. During this period Phalanger was ported to the Silverlight 2.0 framework with the goal of making it work on Moonlight as well.

== Jadu sponsorship ==
Early in 2008, UK Content Management vendor Jadu partnered with the Prague-based team to improve communication between .NET and the Phalanger compiler. It is based on duck typing and provides a way for accessing objects from the dynamic PHP world that lack compile-time type information from a statically typed language in a .NET environment in a type-safe way.

In December 2008, Jadu announced that it has made the compiler available to the developer community and in interviews with ITPRO and VNUnet said that the development would help close the skills gap between PHP and .NET.

== Devsense support & development ==
Since 2009, DEVSENSE company leads the development of the project and offers commercial support. DEVSENSE consists of core Phalanger developers and keeps this open-source project alive.

In addition to maintenance and growth of the project, Devsense is providing Visual Studio integration of Phalanger for the community.

Since 2012, DEVSENSE provides support forum for Phalanger (compiler) and related projects for the community.

== Legacy ==
The last PHP version supported by Phalanger is 5.4. The GitHub project is marked "Deprecated" and (as of 2019) it hasn't been updated for years. The GitHub page also announces a new project, PeachPie compiler as its successor for PHP 7.1. PeachPie can compile code using PHP 5.4 syntax or newer, and is officially supported by .NET Foundation.

== See also ==
- PeachPie
- HHVM
