= Dublin Core =

Standardized set of metadata elements

Logo of DCMI, maintenance agency for Dublin Core Terms

The Dublin Core vocabulary, also known as the Dublin Core Metadata Terms (DCMT), is a general purpose metadata vocabulary for describing resources of any type. It was first developed for describing web content in the early days of the World Wide Web. The Dublin Core Metadata Initiative (DCMI) is responsible for maintaining the Dublin Core vocabulary.

In March 1995, in Dublin, Ohio, the National Center for Supercomputing Applications and Online Computer Library Center held a joint workshop to discuss metadata semantics.

Initially developed as fifteen terms in 1998 the set of elements has grown over time and in 2008 was redefined as a Resource Description Framework (RDF) vocabulary.

Designed with minimal constraints, each Dublin Core element is optional and may be repeated. There is no prescribed order in Dublin Core for presenting or using the elements.

== Milestones ==
- 1995 - In 1995 an invitational meeting hosted by the OCLC Online Computer Library Center and the National Center for Supercomputing Applications (NCSA) takes place at Dublin, Ohio, the headquarters of OCLC.
- 1998, September - RFC 2413 "Dublin Core Metadata for Resource Discovery" details the original 15-element vocabulary.
- 2000 - Issuance of Qualified Dublin Core.
- 2001 - Publication of the Dublin Core Metadata Element Set as ANSI/NISO Z39.85.
- 2008 - Publication of Dublin Core Metadata Initiative Terms in RDF.
- 2017 - Publication of Dublin Core "Core" elements as ISO 15836-1:2017 Information and documentation — The Dublin Core metadata element set Part 1: Core elements.
- 2019 - The RDF properties and classes are published as ISO 15836-2:2019 Information and documentation — The Dublin Core metadata element set Part 2: DCMI Properties and classes.

== Evolution of vocabulary ==
The Dublin Core Element Set was a response to concern about accurate finding of resources on the Web, with some early assumptions that this would be a library function. In particular it anticipated a future in which scholarly materials would be searchable on the World Wide Web. Whereas HTML was being used to mark up the structure of documents, metadata was needed to mark up the contents of documents. Given the great number of documents on the World Wide Web and those soon to be added to it, it was proposed that "self-identifying" documents would be necessary.

To this end, the Dublin Core Metadata Workshop met beginning in 1995 to develop a vocabulary that could be used to insert consistent metadata into Web documents. Originally defined as 15 metadata elements, the Dublin Core Element Set allowed authors of web pages a vocabulary and method for creating simple metadata for their works.

Qualified Dublin Core was developed in the late 1990s to provide an extension mechanism to the vocabulary of 15 elements. This was a response to communities whose metadata needs required additional detail.

In 2012, the DCMI Metadata Terms was created using a RDF data model. This expanded element set incorporates the original 15 elements and many of the qualifiers of the qualified Dublin Core as RDF properties. The full set of elements is found under the namespace http://purl.org/dc/terms/. There is a separate namespace for the original 15 elements as previously defined: http://purl.org/dc/elements/1.1/.

=== Core elements ===
The Dublin Core vocabulary that was published in 1999 consisted of 15 terms:

- contributor
- coverage
- creator
- date
- description
- format
- identifier
- language
- publisher
- relation
- rights
- source
- subject
- title
- type

The vocabulary was commonly expressed in HTML 'meta' tagging in the "<head>" section of an HTML-encoded page.

<head>
   <meta name="DC.title" content="Services to Government" >
   <meta name="DC.date" content="1997-07" >
 </head>

The vocabulary could be used in any metadata serialization including key/value pairs and XML.

=== Qualified Dublin Core ===
Subsequent to the specification of the original 15 elements, Qualified Dublin Core was developed to provide an extension mechanism to be used when the primary 15 terms were not sufficient. A set of common refinements was provided in the documentation. These schemes include controlled vocabularies and formal notations or parsing rules. Qualified Dublin Core was not limited to these specific refinements, allowing communities to create extended metadata terms to meet their needs.

The guiding principle for the qualification of Dublin Core elements, colloquially known as the Dumb-Down Principle, states that an application that does not understand a specific element refinement term should be able to ignore the qualifier and treat the metadata value as if it were an unqualified (broader) element. While this may result in some loss of specificity, the remaining element value (without the qualifier) should continue to be generally correct and useful for discovery.

Qualified Dublin Core added qualifiers to these elements:

Qualified Dublin Core Elements
Element	Qualifier
Title	Alternative
Description	Table Of Contents
"	Abstract
DateCreated	Valid
"	Available
"	Issued
"	Modified
FormatExtent	Medium
Relation	Is Version Of
"	Has Version
"	Is Replaced By
"	Replaces
"	Is Required By
"	Requires
"	Is Part Of
"	Has Part
"	Is Referenced By
"	References
"	Is Format Of
"	Has Format
Coverage	Spatial
"	Temporal

And added three elements not in the base 15:

- Audience
- Provenance
- RightsHolder

Qualified Dublin Core is often used with a "dot syntax", with a period separating the element and the qualifier(s). This is shown in this excerpted example provided by Chan and Hodges:

Title: D-Lib Magazine
Title.alternative: Digital Library Magazine
Identifier.ISSN: 1082-9873
Publisher: Corporation for National Research Initiatives
Publisher.place: Reston, VA.
Subject.topical.LCSH: Digital libraries - Periodicals

=== DCMI Metadata Terms ===
The DCMI Metadata Terms lists the current set of the Dublin Core vocabulary. This set includes the fifteen terms of the DCMES (in italic), as well as many of the qualified terms. Each term has a unique URI in the namespace http://purl.org/dc/terms, and all are defined as RDF properties.

- abstract
- accessRights
- accrualMethod
- accrualPeriodicity
- accrualPolicy
- alternative
- audience
- available
- bibliographicCitation
- conformsTo
- contributor
- coverage
- created
- creator
- date
- dateAccepted
- dateCopyrighted
- dateSubmitted
- description
- educationLevel
- extent
- format
- hasFormat
- hasPart
- hasVersion
- identifier
- instructionalMethod
- isFormatOf
- isPartOf
- isReferencedBy
- isReplacedBy
- isRequiredBy
- issued
- isVersionOf
- language
- license
- mediator
- medium
- modified
- provenance
- publisher
- references
- relation
- replaces
- requires
- rights
- rightsHolder
- source
- spatial
- subject
- tableOfContents
- temporal
- title
- type
- valid

It also includes these RDF classes which are used as domains and ranges of some properties:

- Agent
- AgentClass
- BibliographicResource
- FileFormat
- Frequency
- Jurisdiction
- LicenseDocument
- LinguisticSystem
- Location
- LocationPeriod/OrJurisdiction
- MediaType
- MediaTypeOrExtent
- MethodOfAccrual
- MethodOfInstruction
- PeriodOfTime
- PhysicalMedium
- PhysicalResource
- Policy
- ProvenanceStatement
- RightsStatement
- SizeOrDuration
- Standard

== Standardization ==
The Dublin Core Metadata Terms vocabulary has been formally standardized internationally as ISO 15836 by the International Organization for Standardization (ISO) and as IETF RFC 5013 by the Internet Engineering Task Force (IETF), as well as in the U.S. as ANSI/NISO Z39.85 by the National Information Standards Organization (NISO).

=== Maintenance ===
Changes that are made to the Dublin Core standard are reviewed by a DCMI Usage Board within the context of a DCMI Namespace Policy. This policy describes how terms are assigned and also sets limits on the amount of editorial changes allowed to the labels, definitions, and usage comments.

== Syntax ==
Syntax choices for metadata expressed with the Dublin Core elements depend on context. Dublin Core concepts and semantics are designed to be syntax independent and apply to a variety of contexts, as long as the metadata is in a form suitable for interpretation by both machines and people.

== Applications ==
Despite its limitations, Dublin Core is widely used due to simplicity, maturity and interoperability.

One Document Type Definition based on Dublin Core is the Open Source Metadata Framework (OMF) specification. OMF is in turn used by Rarian (superseding ScrollKeeper), which is used by the GNOME desktop and KDE help browsers and the ScrollServer documentation server.

PBCore is also based on Dublin Core. The Zope CMF's Metadata products, used by the Plone, ERP5, the Nuxeo CPS Content management systems, SimpleDL, and Fedora Commons also implement Dublin Core. The EPUB e-book format uses Dublin Core metadata in the OPF file. Qualified Dublin Core is used in the DSpace archival management software.

The Australian Government Locator Service (AGLS) metadata standard is an application profile of Dublin Core.

== See also ==
- Metadata registry
- Metadata Object Description Schema
- Ontology (information science)
- Open Archives Initiative (OAI)
- Controlled vocabulary
- Interoperability
- Darwin Core, a Dublin Core extension for biodiversity informatics
