= Comparison of X Window System desktop environments =

A desktop environment is a collection of software designed to give functionality and a certain look and feel to an operating system.

This article applies to operating systems which are capable of running the X Window System, mostly Unix and Unix-like operating systems such as Linux, Minix, illumos, Solaris, AIX, FreeBSD and Mac OS X. Microsoft Windows is capable of running X applications through Windows Subsystem for Linux and third-party X servers like Cygwin/X, Exceed, or Xming.

== Technical elements of a desktop environment ==
A desktop environment (DE) can be broken up into several components that function independently and interact with one another to provide the look and feel and functionality of the desktop environment. A fundamental part of a DE is the window manager or WM. A window manager creates a certain way for application windows to present themselves to the user. It manages the various application windows, keeping track of which ones are open and providing features to switch between them. Another important element of a DE is the file manager. This application manages files/ folders and presents them in a way that the user finds convenient. It provides file operations like viewing, copying or moving, changing permissions and deleting. DEs usually provide utilities to set wallpapers and screensavers, display icons on the desktop, and perform some administrative tasks. They may optionally include word processors, CD/DVD writing applications, web browsers and e-mail clients.

There are some exceptions: Window managers like Fluxbox, wmii and Ratpoison operate independently of a desktop environment and were written with this objective in mind. Additional hand-picked applications add functionality such as a panel and volume management which gives them some of the qualities of a full DE. This contrasts the behaviour of WMs like Metacity and KWin which were not written with the objective of operating independently of a DE.

KDE Software Compilation and GNOME are written almost completely on special software libraries Qt and GTK respectively. This usually means that virtually every component of the desktop environment including the file manager explicitly depends on that library for its functioning.

X Window System desktop environments timeline.

Notably, nothing prevents the user from installing any number of software libraries of their choice. In practice, software written on major libraries can be run under any desktop environment. Running a package designed for one desktop (which essentially means that it's written using the same libraries as the desktop itself is) within a different desktop can be visually displeasing, as well as incurring the RAM penalty of loading libraries that wouldn't otherwise be required.

Some of the differences which can influence the choice of desktop environment are:

- Look and feel of the desktop environment. The user will be more comfortable with a certain look and feel that they may or may not already be familiar with.
- Flexibility and configurability of the desktop environment. A sophisticated user might want a highly configurable desktop environment to make the desktop environment work the way they want. A beginner might just want an easy-to-use environment to which they will adjust.
- Personal preferences for choice of software, which has two aspects:
  - Each desktop environment comes packaged with various default software and various "ways things are done" under that desktop. A casual user might like a highly integrated graphical interface to change various settings while a more experienced user might prefer to use individual configuration utilities or even CLI tools.
  - Desktops are also often closely tied into various major functional components of the desktop manager (example: file manager, browser, word processor); whilst "mix and match" is possible, it is generally pleasing to make choices which result in a consistent look and feel of programs under the chosen desktop environment. Making choices based on what software integrates with a chosen desktop environment necessarily limits the weight that can be given to other application features.

== Desktop comparison information ==
=== Overview ===
Name	Initial release	Latest release		Programming language	Graphical toolkit	License	Notes
Name	Initial release	Version	Date	Programming language	Graphical toolkit	License	Notes
Budgie	2014-02-07	10.10.2	2026-03-07	C, Vala	GTK	GPL	The intention was to use GNOME components to create a more lightweight and traditional desktop that still had most of the features that GNOME provided at the time.
Cinnamon	2011-04	6.6.9	2026-07-20	C, JavaScript, Python	GTK	GPL	Forked from GNOME 3 with the intent to create a traditional desktop built on modern technologies.
Common Desktop Environment (CDE)	1993-06-30	2.5.2	2023-11-18	C, C++	Motif	LGPL-2.0-or-later	Part of the UNIX 98 Workstation Product Standard. Released in 2012 under a free license.
Deepin Desktop Environment (DDE)	2015	23.1	2025-04-16	C++	Qt	GPL	The desktop environment of Deepin.
Enlightenment (E)	1997	0.27.1	2025-03-14	C	EFL	BSD license	Complete environment including centralized configuration of most settings.
Equinox Desktop Environment (EDE)	2003-01-06	2.1	2014-06-22	C++	FLTK	GPL, LGPL	Seldom used environment, has seen little activity in recent years.
Étoilé	2006-02-22	0.4.2	2012-04-11	Objective-C	GNUstep	MIT, BSD license	Has seen little activity for several years, the last sign of activity having been in 2014.
GNOME	1999-03-03	50.2	2026-06-05	C, C++, Vala, Python, JavaScript	GTK	GPL, LGPL	GNOME is one of the most popular environments. Major design changes with the 3.0 release sparked the creation of Cinnamon (a fork of GNOME 3), Unity (an alternative Gnome Desktop Session to GNOME Shell) and MATE (a fork of GNOME 2).
KDE Plasma 5 (KDE5, KDE Plasma Workspaces, formerly K Desktop Environment or simply KDE)	1998-07-12	5.27.12	2025-01-06	C++, QML	Qt	LGPL	KDE has a strong and enthusiastic following. The project is largely community-centric, and encompass many other applications and frameworks, many built specifically for KDE.
LXDE (Lightweight X11 Desktop Environment)	2006	0.10.1	2021-02-25	C	GTK	GPL, LGPL	LXDE, with its low resource footprint, is a favorite among developers of lighter-weight Linux distributions. Development has largely moved to LXQt, but it is still maintained and in 2020 ported to GTK3.
LXQt	2014-05-07	2.4.0	2026-04-20	C, C++	Qt	GPL, LGPL	Formed by a merger of LXDE-Qt and Razor-qt, this is a lightweight Qt-based desktop environment.
MATE	2011-08-19	1.28.2	2024-03-11	C, C++, Python	GTK	LGPL, GPL	Revival and continuation of GNOME 2 environment after the release of GNOME 3. In recent releases, it has been ported to GTK 3, demonstrating the progress of the project.
Pantheon	2011	8.2.4	2025-06-30	Vala	GTK	GPL	The desktop environment of elementary OS.
Razor-qt	2010-09-05	0.5.2	2013-01-12	C++	Qt	GPL	Merged into LXQt
ROX Desktop	2000 (?)			C, Python	GTK	GPL	–
Trinity Desktop Environment (TDE)	2010-04-29	R14.1.4	2025-04-27	C++	Qt	GPL (and other)	Forked from KDE 3.x
Unity	2010-06-09	7.6	2022-06-30	C, C++, Python, Vala, QML	GTK	GPL, LGPL	Developed by Canonical for Ubuntu as an alternative graphical shell to GNOME Shell. Designed with "convergence" in mind, it was discontinued by Canonical in early 2017 because Unity 8 had some problems, including Mir and X app support. Was picked up by UBPorts and renamed "Lomiri."
Xfce	1997-early	4.20	2024-12-15	C	GTK	GPL, LGPL, BSD license	Xfce is often used in lightweight distributions targeting lower-end hardware.

=== Default programs packaged ===
This table shows basic information on the programs distributed with some desktop environments for the X Window System.

	KDE	GNOME	MATE	Cinnamon	Xfce	LXDE	ROX Desktop	Étoilé	EDE	Enlightenment	LXQt
X window manager	KWin	Mutter	Marco	Muffin	Xfwm4	Openbox	OroboROX	Azalea	edewm	Enlightenment	KWin
X display manager	KDM, SDDM	GDM		LightDM		LXDM			elma	Entrance	SDDM
File manager	Dolphin (Konqueror before SC 4)	Files	Caja	Nemo	Thunar	PCManFM	ROX Filer		Efiler	EFM, Entropy	PCManFM-Qt
Widget toolkit	Qt	GTK				GTK+(legacy) / Qt	GTK	GNUstep	FLTK (previously eFLTK)	Elementary	Qt
Terminal emulator	Konsole	GNOME Terminal	MATE Terminal	GNOME Terminal	Terminal	LXTerminal	ROXTerm	aterm		Terminology	Qterminal
Text editor	KWrite (Kate before SC 4)	gedit	Pluma	Xed	Mousepad, Leafpad	Leafpad	Edit	TextEdit		Eyesight, Ecrire	Mousepad
Video player	Dragon Player (Kaffeine before SC 4)	Videos		Celluloid	Parole	lxine	mplayer-rox			Enna (media center), Eclair, Rage	
Audio player	JuK, Amarok	Banshee, Rhythmbox			Parole	LXMusic	MusicBox	Melodie		Enjoy	
CD burners	K3b	Brasero			Xfburn		RoxISO				Xfburn
CD ripper	K3b, KAudioCreator	Sound Juicer					Ripper			Extrackt	
Image viewer	Gwenview	Loupe (GNOME Image Viewer)	Eye of MATE	Xviewer	Ristretto	GPicView	Picky		Eimage	Ephoto	
Office suite	Calligra Suite (KOffice until 2011)	GnomeOffice									
Web browser	Konqueror, Falkon	Web			Midori					Eve	
E-mail client	Kmail	Evolution					GNUMail				
Personal information manager	Kontact	Evolution					Contacts				
Instant messenger	Kopete, KDE Telepathy	Empathy								Shotgun	
Archive manager	Ark	Archive Manager	Engrampa	Archive Manager	Xarchiver, Squeeze	Xarchiver	Archive				LXQt-manager
PDF viewer	Okular (KPDF before SC 4)	Evince	Atril	Xreader				Vindaloo		Epdf	
IDE	KDevelop	Anjuta, GNOME Builder						Gorm, ProjectCenter		EDI	
X session manager	ksmserver	gnome-session	mate-session	cinnamon-session	Xfce4-session	LXSession	ROX-Session				
Widget engine	built-in – Plasma (SuperKaramba before SC 4)	gDesklets								Elementary	
Licenses used	GPL, LGPL, BSD, others	GPL, LGPL	GPL, LGPL	GPLv2 (or later)	GPL, LGPL, BSD	GPL, LGPL	GPL	GPL, BSD	GPL, LGPL	BSD, LGPL	GPL, LGPL

Note that Razor-qt has become LXQt, a port of LXDE to the Qt framework.

=== Comparison of ease of use and stability ===
GNOME's graphical file manager Files (Nautilus) is intended to be very easy to use and has many features. KDE's file manager Dolphin is described as focused on usability. Prior to KDE version 4, the KDE project's standard file manager was Konqueror, which was also designed for ease of use.

Both GNOME and KDE come with many graphical configuration tools, reducing the need to manually edit configuration files for new users. They have extensive bundled software such as graphical menu editors, text editors, audio players, and software for doing administrative work. All applications installed in most distributions are automatically added to the GNOME and KDE menus. No major configuration changes are necessary to begin working. However, by using graphical tools, the extent to which the desktops can be configured is determined by the power provided by those tools.

== Compatibility and interoperability issues ==
Some desktop environments and window managers claim that they support applications made for other desktop environments explicitly. For example, Fluxbox states KDE support in its feature list. Using software made specifically for the desktop environment in use or window manager agnostic software is a way to avoid issues. For software developers, the Portland Project has released a set of common interfaces that allows applications to integrate across many desktop environments.

== See also ==
- Comparison of X window managers
- Comparison of file managers
- Croquet Project
- freedesktop.org
- Minimalism (computing)
- Software bloat
