= XDM =

XDM, xdm, or similar can refer to:

== Computing ==
- X display manager, a part of the X Window System architecture
- XDM (display manager), the default display manager included with the X Window System
- XQuery and XPath Data Model
- Cross-document messaging, that works around the limits set by the same origin policy in a web browser

== Firearms ==
- Springfield Armory XD-M, a pistol series sold in the United States by Springfield Armory, Inc.

== Gaming ==
- XDM: X-Treme Dungeon Mastery, a role-playing game supplement by Tracy Hickman, Curtis Hickman and Howard Tayler.

== See also ==
- "XD^{M}", a song by Overkill from the album White Devil Armory, 2014
