= GNOME Display Manager =

Display manager for the windowing systems X11 and Wayland

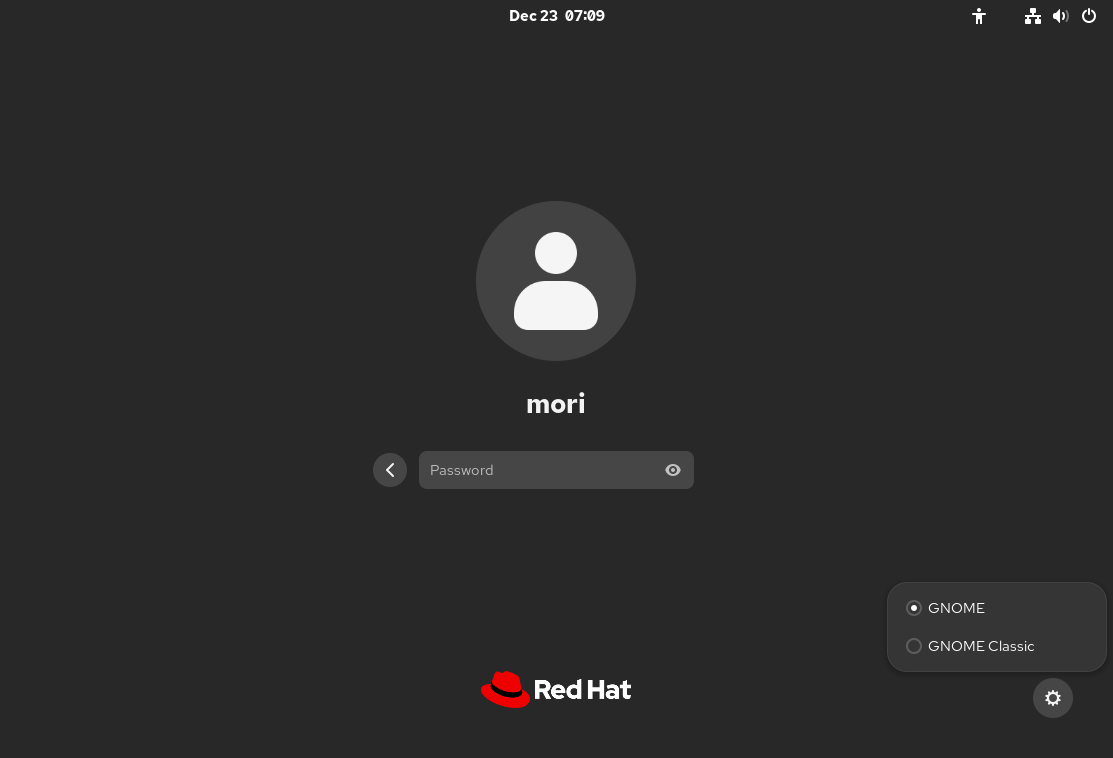
- GNOME Display Manager 47 (its default appearance uses a dark theme)
- Developers: The GNOME Project (William Jon McCann, Brian Cameron, Ray Strode)
- Stable release: 50.1 / 28 May 2026; 28 days ago
- Written in: C
- Operating system: Unix and Unix-like (Linux, BSD)
- Type: Login manager for Wayland
- License: GPL-2.0-or-later
- Website: gitlab.gnome.org/GNOME/gdm
- Repository: gitlab.gnome.org/GNOME/gdm.git

GNOME Display Manager (GDM) is a graphical login manager ("display manager") for the windowing system Wayland and formerly X11.

The X Window System by default uses the XDM display manager. However, resolving XDM configuration issues typically involves editing a configuration file. GDM allows users to customize or troubleshoot settings without having to resort to a command line. Users can pick their session type on a per-login basis. GDM 2.38.0 is the last version that features customization with themes; subsequent releases do not support themes.

== Software architecture ==
GDM is a display manager that implements all significant features required for managing attached and remote displays. GDM was written from scratch and does not contain any XDM or X Consortium code.

=== Components ===
GDM comprises the following components:

- Greeter – the graphical login window (provided by GNOME Shell)
- Pluggable authentication module (PAM)

== Hidden features ==
Until version 2.22, GDM had a few Easter eggs, in the form of strings to be entered in the username box. These can be found in the source file "gui/guilogin.c", in a function named "evil".

- Dancing login – type "Start Dancing" to start, and "Stop Dancing" to stop.
  - (This requires the standard greeter ("GTK+ Greeter"), rather than the graphical one ("Themed Greeter")).
- "Gimme Random Cursor" – can be used repeatedly.
  - This changes the mouse cursor to a randomly selected 1 of 77 different "cursor fonts" as defined in the X11 specification.
- "Require Quarter" (or "Require Quater", for backward compatibility with a typo in the original), then log in normally – a dialog box that reads "Please insert 25 cents to log in." appears after entering the password. Clicking "OK" allows the login process to proceed as normal.

=== Queen of England ===
Some of the copyright notices of GDM refer to the "Queen of England", whom release announcements from version 2.2.1 also named as a maintainer. Subsequently, developers realised that the title "Queen of England" has not existed since the Acts of Union of 1707.

== See also ==
1. getty – a non-graphical login program
2. LightDM
3. SDDM (KDE Plasma 5 and KDE Plasma 6)
4. KDE Display Manager (KDE Plasma 4)
