= LTSP =

LTSP may refer to:

- Linux Terminal Server Project
- Lutheran Theological Seminary at Philadelphia
