= KDE Display Manager =

Display manager for the X windowing system

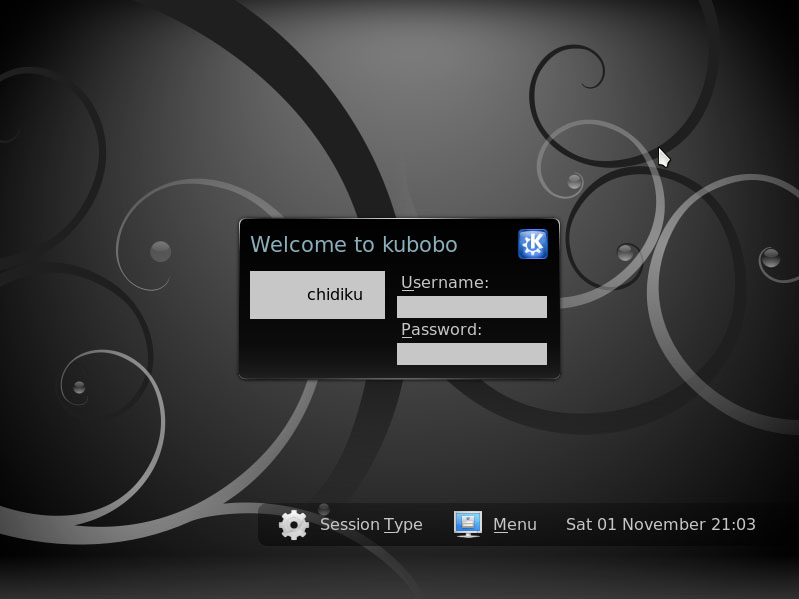
- Developer: KDE
- Written in: C, C++
- Operating system: BSD, Linux, Solaris, other Unix-like
- Successor: SDDM
- Type: X display manager
- License: GPL, X11
- Website: kde.org

KDE Display Manager (KDM) was a display manager (a graphical login program) developed by KDE for the X Window System.

KDE Display Manager was based on the source code of X display manager and was the default display manager of the KDE Software Compilation, until it was retired in KDE Plasma 5 in favour of SDDM.

KDM allowed the user to choose a desktop environment or window manager at login. KDM used the Qt application framework. It is configurable via KDE's System Settings; its appearance can be customized by the user.

The default KDM login screen had a list of users. Each entry was comprised in the user's username, personal name (if available), and an icon. Next to the list is a greeting and a picture. One of the customization options is to replace the picture with an analog clock. From this screen the user can also run a user management tool, shut down or reboot the computer, or restart the X Window System.

== See also ==
- getty – a non-graphical login program
- Simple Desktop Display Manager (SDDM), successor to KDM
- GDM, the GNOME display manager.
- LightDM, the Light display manager, was written for Ubuntu, now independent.
