= RULE Project =

RULE (Run Up-to-Date Linux Everywhere) was a project that aimed to use up-to-date Linux software on old PCs (5 years or older) by recompiling and modifying some of the code in recent programs to make them use fewer resources, allowing them to run more smoothly and efficiently.

Activity around the RULE project almost came to a complete halt in 2006, and in 2009, the project's head developer initiated an effort to clean up and freeze the project and its website. This was done to keep the completed project available in a tidy manner.

As of now (April 2023) the project is frozen with no activity surrounding the RULE project since October 2010.

== Usecases ==
The principal advantages of using old PCs with up to date software are:

- support for more up-to-date standards (HTML4, Java, etc.)
- more secure to use because of patched security holes
- old PCs may consume less energy than new ones, making them cheaper to use and reducing pollution
- re-use PCs that would otherwise be discarded, thus reducing e-waste
- PCs are not cheap, especially for third world or Eastern European countries, or for big volumes (for example a school needs a lot of PCs.)

== Information about the project ==
- The distributions of Linux that have been the focus for the project are Fedora Core and Red Hat, but users/developers of other distributions are welcomed.
- The main activity of the RULE site is to test contributors' packages and provide user documentation and easy installation procedures.

== See also ==
- Lightweight Linux distribution
- Linux Terminal Server Project (a very different approach to the same problem)
