= Equinox Desktop Environment =

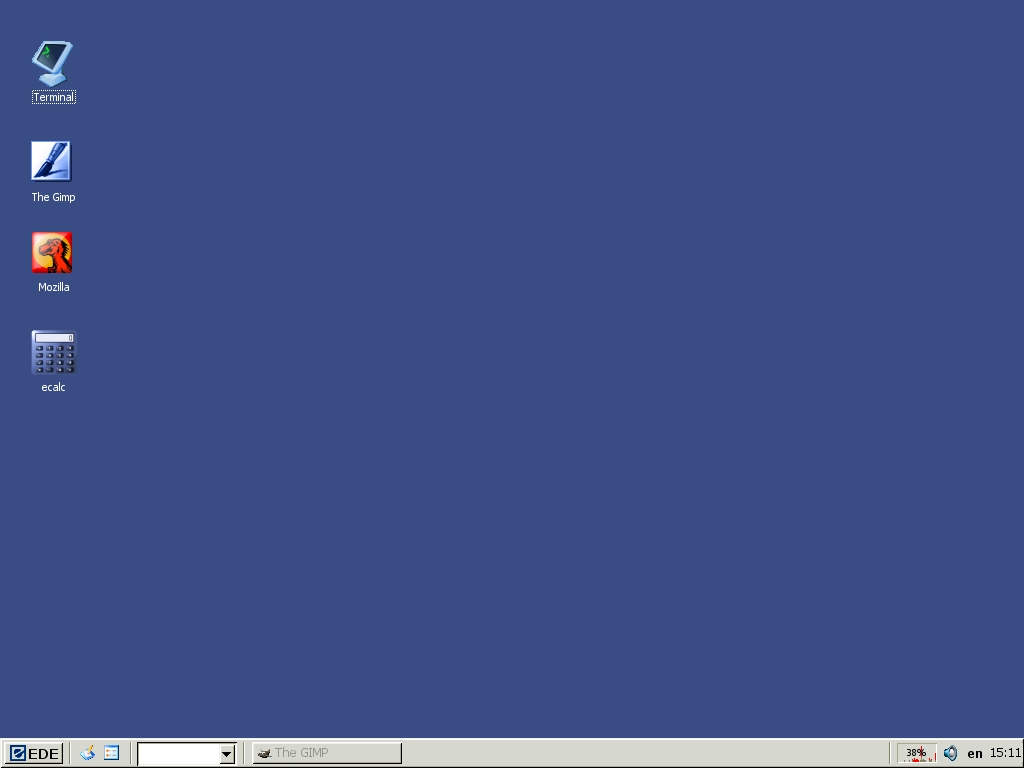
- Type: Desktop environment
- License: GNU General Public License
- Website: edeproject.org

Equinox Desktop Environment (EDE) is an FLTK-based desktop environment for Unix-like operating systems, following the principles of Unix-philosophy. EDE is designed to be light on system resource usage.

EDE is licensed as free software under the terms of the GNU General Public License version 2, with parts (edelib) under the GNU Lesser General Public License version 2 license. The latest version of EDE is 2.1, it was released in 2014. The initial release of EDE was made in 2003.

EDE is developed by Sanel Zukan and Vedran Ljubovic, and is based on an extended version of FLTK. EDE uses pekwm as its window manager.

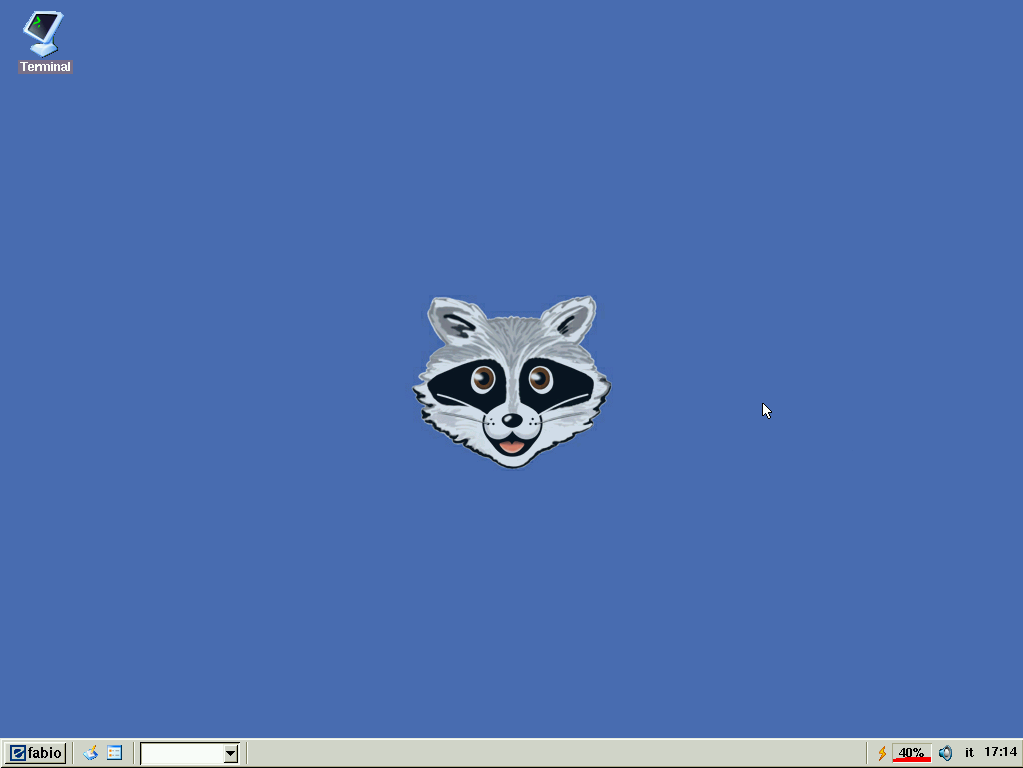
EDE running on MINIX 3.1.7 with X11

The appearance of EDE has been described as being reminiscent of the interface of Windows 95. EDE has been described to be good with system performance, as well as its source code base being quick to compile. EDE is also suitable for lower end computing hardware with its minimal system requirements and low memory usage.

EDE is portable. On OpenBSD EDE works with architectures Aarch64, DEC Alpha, Amd64, ARM, Hppa, i386, M88K, MIPS64, Mips64el, PowerPC, Powerpc64, RISC-V, SuperH, and SPARC64.

== See also ==
- FLWM
- Dillo
- Comparison of X Window System desktop environments
