= X terminal =

Computing device

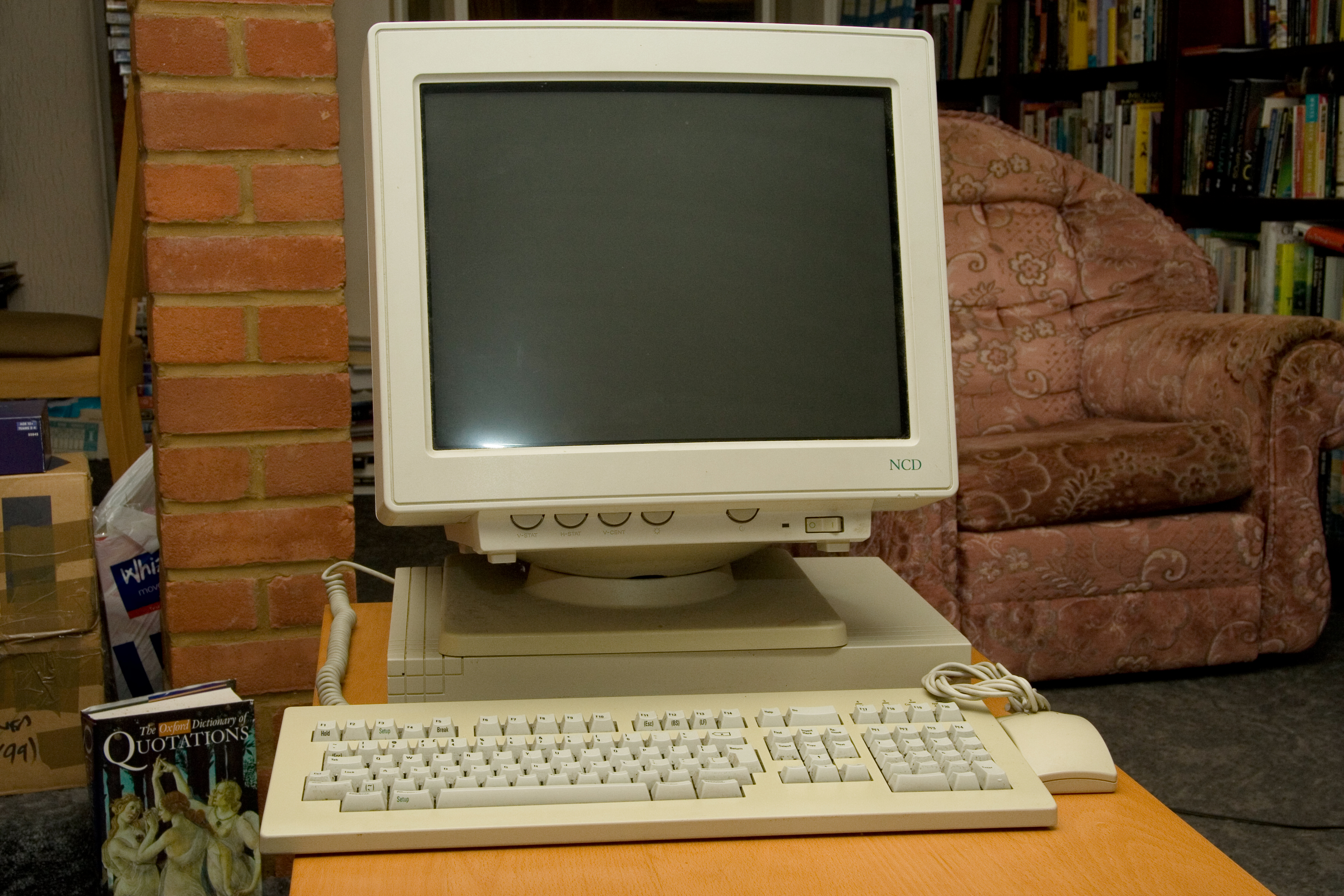
A Network Computing Devices NCD-88k X terminal

An X server runs on the X terminal, connecting to a central computer running an X display manager. In this example, client programs (xterm and xedit) are running on the same computer.

In computing, an X terminal is a display/input terminal or thin client built to run an X server for the X Window System and display graphical applications whose programs normally execute on one or more remote host computers. Unlike a text-only terminal, an X terminal can show multiple applications in separate windows and accept keyboard and mouse input while communicating with several hosts over a network, typically Ethernet. X terminals enjoyed a period of popularity in the early 1990s when they offered a lower total cost of ownership alternative to a full Unix workstation.

Thin clients have somewhat supplanted X terminals in that they are equipped with added flash memory and software for communication with remote desktop protocols.

== Design ==
In the X Window model, the terminal itself runs the X server that controls the display, keyboard and pointing device, while application programs run as X clients on a host system and send drawing commands over the network. Because the X architecture separates the client application from the display server, an X terminal can present programs from multiple hosts on the same screen.

Many X terminals were designed as closed systems rather than full workstations. Digital Equipment Corporation engineers wrote in 1991 that this reduced the amount of memory, storage and operating-system support required, allowing X terminals to be sold more cheaply than general-purpose X workstations. Even so, some models included built-in local software such as a window manager, configuration tools or an ANSI terminal emulator, allowing them to function in non-X environments or when no remote host was immediately available. Purpose-built units also tended to have little or no persistent local storage, keeping only firmware or small amounts of non-volatile memory for configuration data.

== Operation ==
Login and session setup were commonly handled through the X Display Manager Control Protocol (XDMCP). In direct mode, an X terminal contacted a specified login server when it booted, and the server displayed a login screen on the terminal. In indirect mode, the terminal contacted a login server, received a chooser screen, and let the user select from a list of available hosts. Oracle's documentation for the Solaris Common Desktop Environment also notes that older X terminals without XDMCP support could still be managed by listing them in the Xservers file on the login server.

== History ==
A 1991 Datapro survey described X terminals as a new class of graphics terminal that first appeared in 1988. The same survey reported that NCD held more than half of the world market by September 1990 and had shipped more than 29,000 X terminals to over 900 customers.

Vendors marketed X terminals as a lower-cost alternative to Unix workstations for users who mainly needed networked graphical sessions rather than fully local computing resources. Datapro wrote in 1991 that X terminals could provide windowing capability, high-resolution graphics and relatively fast processing for prices starting around US$1,500, compared with workstations that could cost more than US$10,000. Digital's VT1000 family, introduced in 1990, combined X Window support with up to six VT320 emulation windows and ROM-based software, illustrating the hybrid graphical and terminal-emulation role pursued by several vendors.

The market expanded rapidly in the early 1990s. A 1991 Computer Business Review report citing International Data Corporation estimated worldwide shipments at 63,000 units in 1990 and projected compound annual growth of about 60 percent over the next four years. By 1993, X terminals still accounted for 51 percent of the total X Window market, with 265,712 units shipped worldwide, although price competition had started to reduce revenue growth.

== Decline and legacy ==
During the mid-1990s, improved PC-based X servers began to compete directly with dedicated X terminals, and some customers shifted to personal computers that could serve as both desktops and X displays. Later thin clients absorbed much of the same role while adding local flash storage and support for remote desktop protocols beyond X11. Writing in 2005, Linux Journal said that dedicated X terminals had largely fallen out of fashion in the late 1990s because falling PC prices eroded their cost advantage.

Although dedicated hardware X terminals became uncommon, the underlying X11 model of separating application execution from display and input remained important in Unix and Unix-like network computing.

== Vendors ==
In the early 1990s, several vendors introduced X terminals including HP, DEC (including the VT1000 series), IBM, Samsung, NCD, Gipsi, Tektronix, and Visual Technology.

== See also ==
- Blit (computer terminal)
- Thin client
