= BootVis =

Microsoft computer application

BootVis is a Microsoft computer application that allows "PC system designers and software developers" (not aimed at end-users) to check how long a Windows XP machine takes to boot, and then to optimize the boot process, sometimes considerably reducing the time required. BootVis has been replaced with XbootMgr, and is no longer available from Microsoft's website.

== Use ==
BootVis defines boot and resume times as the time from when the power switch is pressed to the time at which the user is able to start a program from a desktop shortcut. The application measures time taken during Windows XP's boot or resume period. BootVis can also invoke the optimization routines built into Windows XP, such as defragmenting the files accessed during boot, to improve startup performance. This optimization is automatically done by Windows at three-day intervals.

Because the Global Logger session used by BootVis is triggered by registry entries, it runs every time that the entries appear in the registry, which has resulted in some users seeing large quantities of hard drive being used for the trace.log file (in C:\WINDOWS\System32\LogFiles\WMI). Upon rebooting the file will shrink but will grow again as the computer runs. The user can run BootVis again and click Trace→Stop Tracing, which will stop the file from growing and allow it to be safely deleted. The Bootvis.exe tool is no longer available from Microsoft.

== Similar tools ==
- Soluto would measure the boot time and let the user decide if and when a software should be started automatically. It used an information database populated by the input from the user.
- WinBootInfo logs drivers and applications loaded during system boot, measures Windows boot times, records CPU and I/O activity during the boot.
- Boot Log XP troubleshoots boot-up problems in Windows XP, creates a new boot log file.
- r2 Studios' Startup Delayer allows users to optionally delay or disable applications that would otherwise run during start up.
