= Login manager =

Login system for Unix and Unix-like operating systems

A login manager is a login system for Unix and Unix-like operating systems. It comprises a login daemon, a login user interface, and a system for tracking login sessions. When a user tries to log in, the login manager passes the user's credentials to an authentication system.

Since an X display manager is a graphical user interface for login, some people use the terms display manager and login manager synonymously.

systemd, an init daemon for Linux, has an integrated login manager; its login daemon is called logind. systemd's login manager is a replacement for the no longer maintained ConsoleKit.

== See also ==
- BSD Authentication
- Name Service Switch
- passwd
- Pluggable authentication module
