= Null session =

A null session is an anonymous connection to an inter-process communication network service on Windows-based computers. The service is designed to allow named pipe connections but may be used by attackers to remotely gather information about the system.

== Exposure ==
From a NULL session, hackers can call APIs and use Remote Procedure calls to enumerate information. These techniques can, and will provide information on passwords, groups, services, users and even active processors. NULL session access can also even be used for escalating privileges and perform DoS attacks.

— Ixis Research LTD
