= XDM (display manager) =

Linux display manager

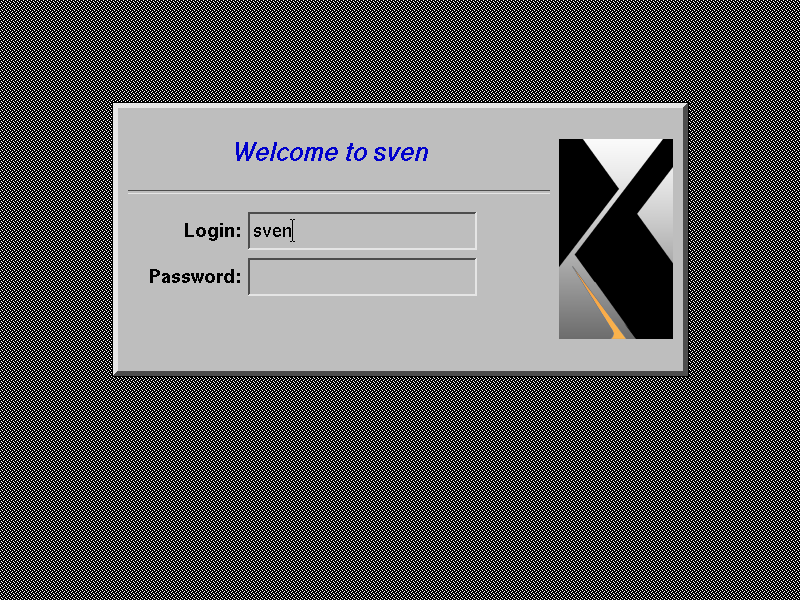
- A screenshot of an XDM login screen
- Original author: Keith Packard
- Developer: X.Org Foundation
- Release: October 1988; 37 years ago
- Stable release: 1.1.17 / 9 March 2025; 18 months ago
- Written in: C, C++
- Type: X display manager
- License: MIT License
- Repository: gitlab.freedesktop.org/xorg/app/xdm

The X Display Manager (XDM) is the default display manager for the X Window System. It is a bare-bones X display manager. It was introduced with X11 Release 3 in October 1988, to support the standalone X terminals that were just coming onto the market. It was written by Keith Packard.

== Functions ==
XDM is used to boot an X.org based desktop environment. It can control a display directly or indirectly in order to start an X session and supports remote login. XDM is initialized on system startup.

It can be edited through the use of a configuration file, modules, or scripts. The configuration file is usually found in /usr/lib/X11/xdm/xdm-config.

== History ==
XDM is one of the earliest display managers for Linux. It was developed by Keith Packard after he joined the X Consortium due to his frustration using a text-based environment to try and configure X.

XDM is available but unused on most systems because of its rudimentary nature. Desktop environments released afterwards tended to include their own display manager, such as dtlogin on CDE.

== See also ==
- X display manager
- GDM
- KDM
