= LightDM =

Display manager for X windowing systems

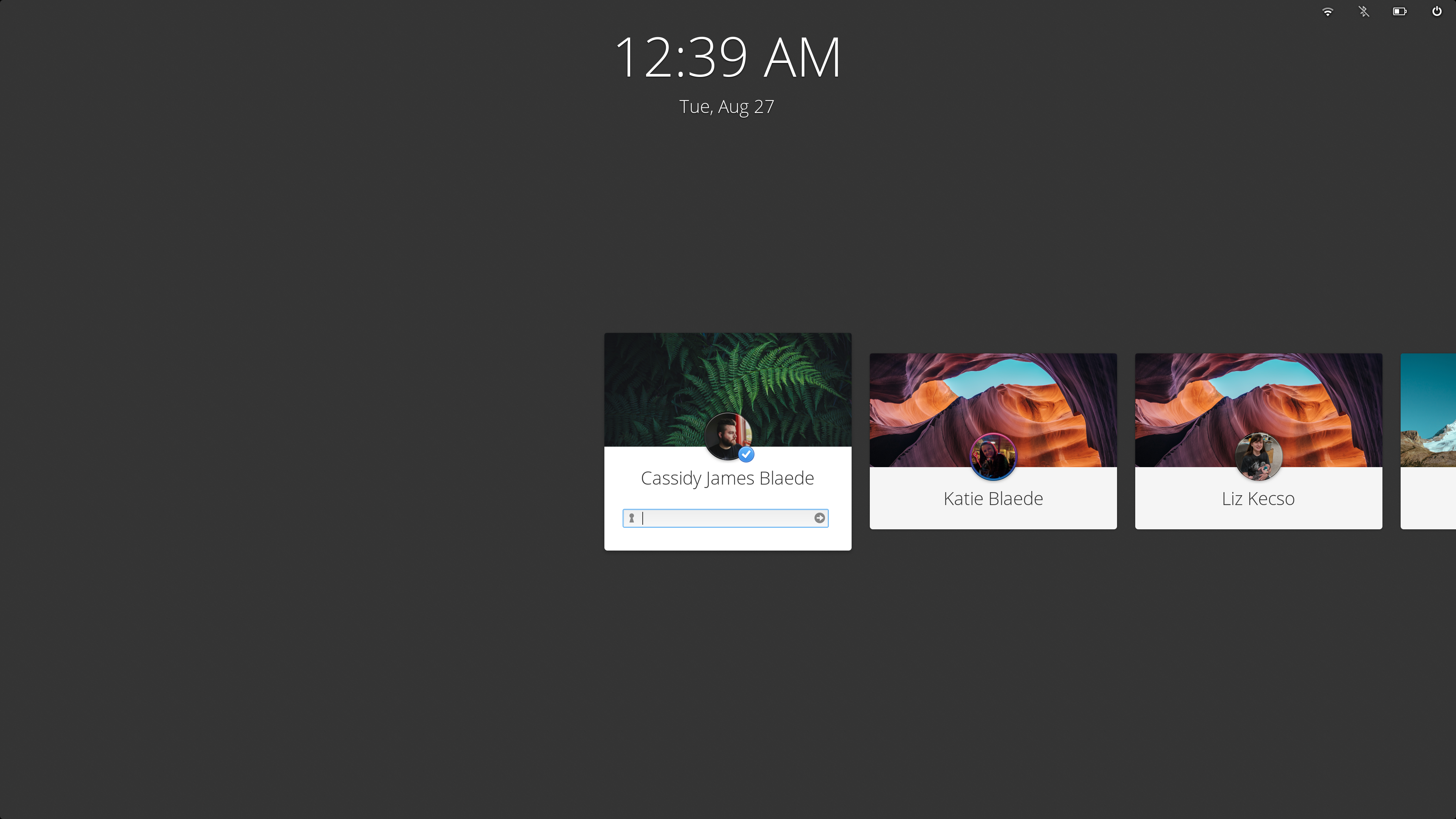
- LightDM in elementaryOS with its default "Pantheon Greeter 5.0" front-end
- Original author: Robert Ancell
- Developers: Robert Ancell; David Edmundson
- Release: September 10, 2010; 16 years ago
- Stable release: 1.33.1 / 16 August 2026; 2 months ago
- Written in: C
- Operating system: Linux, OpenIndiana
- Size: 1 MB
- Available in: >50 languages
- Type: X display manager
- License: GPL-3.0-or-later
- Website: github.com/ubuntu/lightdm
- Repository: github.com/ubuntu/lightdm

LightDM is a free and open-source X display manager that aims to be lightweight, fast, extensible and desktop environment agnostic. It can use various front-ends to draw the user interface, also called Greeters. It also supports Wayland.

LightDM is the default display manager for Edubuntu, Xubuntu and Mythbuntu since the 11.10 release, for Lubuntu since the 12.04 release until 16.10, for Kubuntu beginning with 12.10 until 15.04 for Linux Mint and EndeavourOS.

== Features ==
Features include:

- Codebase with very few dependencies
- Supports different display technologies (X11 and Wayland through Mir)
- Supports remote login (incoming – XDMCP, VNC, outgoing – XDMCP, pluggable)
- Comprehensive test suite
- Standards-compliance (PAM, logind, etc.)
- Well-defined interface between the server and user interface
- Cross-desktop (greeters can be written in any toolkit)
- Well-defined greeter API allowing multiple GUIs
- Support for all display manager use cases, with plug-ins where appropriate

LightDM has a simpler code base than GDM and does not load any GNOME libraries to work, but at the cost of some features that the user may or may not need.

=== Available greeters ===
LightDM Greeters in active development
Name	Key feature(s)	Version	Website
Arctica Greeter	Greeter for Arctica, fork of Unity Greeter	0.99.1.4	github.com/ArcticaProject/arctica-greeter
Deepin Greeter	Greeter for Deepin	5.0.0	github.com/linuxdeepin/dde-session-ui
GTK Greeter	Greeter for Xubuntu and former GTK reference implementation, former Lubuntu default, Xubuntu default	2.0.8	github.com/Xubuntu/lightdm-gtk-greeter
Mini Greeter	Minimalist, single-user. INI configuration	0.5.1	github.com/prikhi/lightdm-mini-greeter
Pantheon Greeter	Greeter for elementary OS	7.0.0	github.com/elementary/greeter
Qt5 Greeter	Greeter for Qt 5	0.11.1	gitlab.com/rezso/lightdm-qt6-greeter
Slick Greeter	Greeter for Linux Mint, fork of Unity Greeter	2.2.7	github.com/linuxmint/slick-greeter
WebEngine Greeter	QtWebEngine-based, C++ rewrite of Web Greeter 3.0	—	github.com/matijaskala/lightdm-webengine-greeter
Web Greeter	QtWebEngine-based, continuing Antergos Web Greeter 3.0, allows to create web based themes	3.4.1	github.com/JezerM/web-greeter
WebKit2 Greeter	Easy theming	2.0.0	gitlab.com/tearch-linux/applications-and-tools/lightdm-webkit2-greeter
Dormant LightDM Greeters
Name	Key feature(s)	Version	Website
Antergos Web Greeter	Default greeter for Antergos. Uses HTML/JavaScript for theming	2.2.5	github.com/Antergos/web-greeter
Crowd Greeter	Demonstration for an OpenGL-based Greeter	0.0.2	launchpad.net/crowd-greeter
GTK Builder Greeter	An alternative implementation from LXDE for GTK based on GtkBuilder featuring WYSIWYG theme editing with Glade Interface Designer.	0.2.0	lxde.git.sourceforge.net/git/gitweb.cgi?p=lxde%2Fldm-gtk-builder-greeter%3Ba%3Dsummary
KDE Greeter	Plasma 4 integration, Kubuntu default until superseded by SDDM	0.3.2.2	github.com/KDE/lightdm
LXQt Greeter	Qt-only Greeter for LXQt desktop (formerly Razor Greeter) until superseded by SDDM	0.7	github.com/surlykke/qt-lightdm-greeter
Qt Greeter	Reference implementation in Qt	—	launchpad.net/lightdm-qt-greeter
Unity Greeter	Former Ubuntu default	15.04.3	launchpad.net/unity-greeter

== See also ==
- SDDM
- XDM (display manager)
- GNOME Display Manager
