= X server =

X server may refer to:

- a display server for the X Window System
- X.Org Server, the X.Org Foundation's display server for the X Window System
- HPE Integrity Superdome X Server, a line of HPE Integrity Servers
