= KDE Plasma 5 =

2014 desktop environment

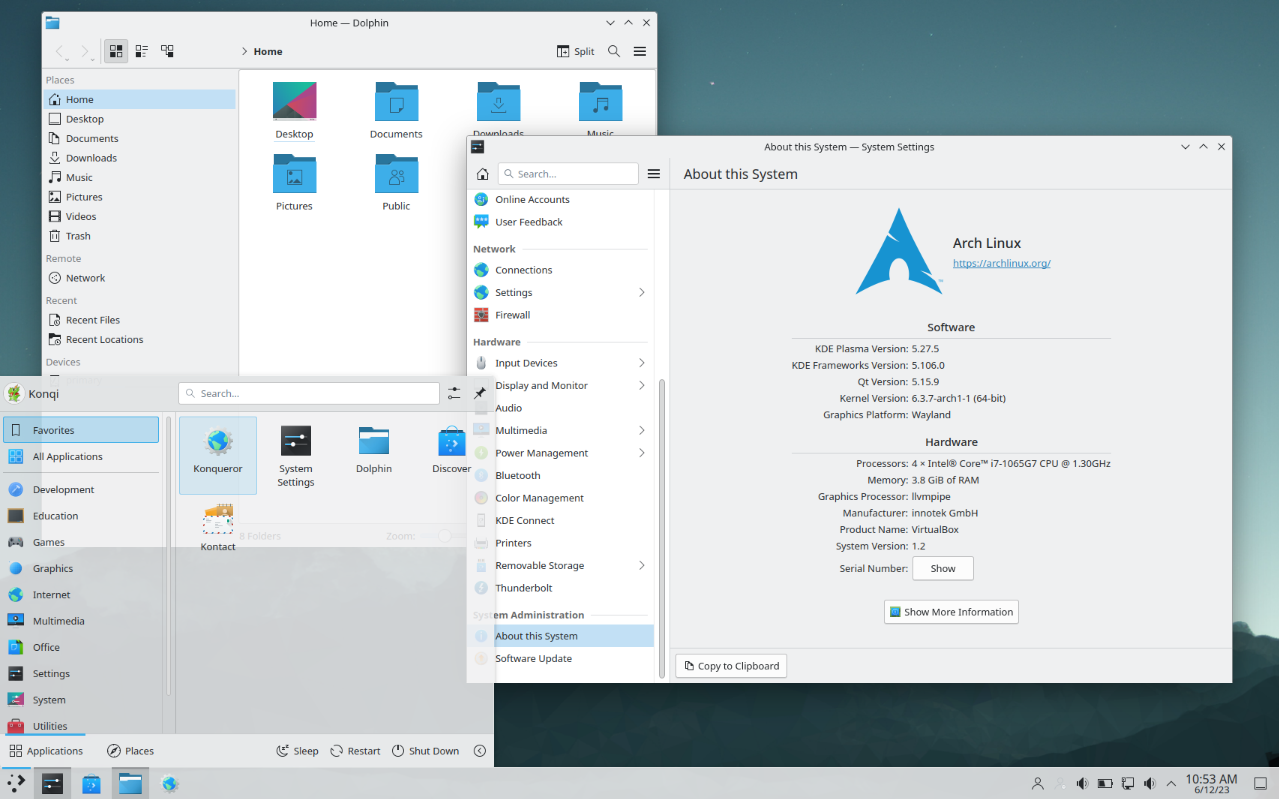
- The KDE Plasma 5 desktop, running on Arch Linux
- Developer: KDE
- Release: 15 July 2014; 12 years ago
- Stable release: 5.27.12 / 6 January 2025; 22 months ago
- Preview release: n/a
- Written in: C++, QML
- Operating system: Unix-like
- Platform: FreeBSD, OpenBSD and Linux
- Predecessor: KDE Plasma 4
- Successor: KDE Plasma 6
- Type: Desktop environment
- License: GPL 2.0 or later
- Website: kde.org/plasma-desktop
- Repository: invent.kde.org/plasma

KDE Plasma 5 is the fifth generation of the KDE Plasma graphical workspaces environment, created by KDE primarily for Linux systems. KDE Plasma 5 is the successor of KDE Plasma 4 and was first released on 15 July 2014. It was succeeded by KDE Plasma 6 on 28 February 2024.

Plasma 5 includes a new default theme, "Breeze", and increased convergence across different devices. The graphical interface was fully migrated to QML, which uses OpenGL for hardware acceleration, providing better performance and reduced power consumption.

Plasma Mobile is a Plasma 5 variant for Linux-based smartphones.

== Overview ==
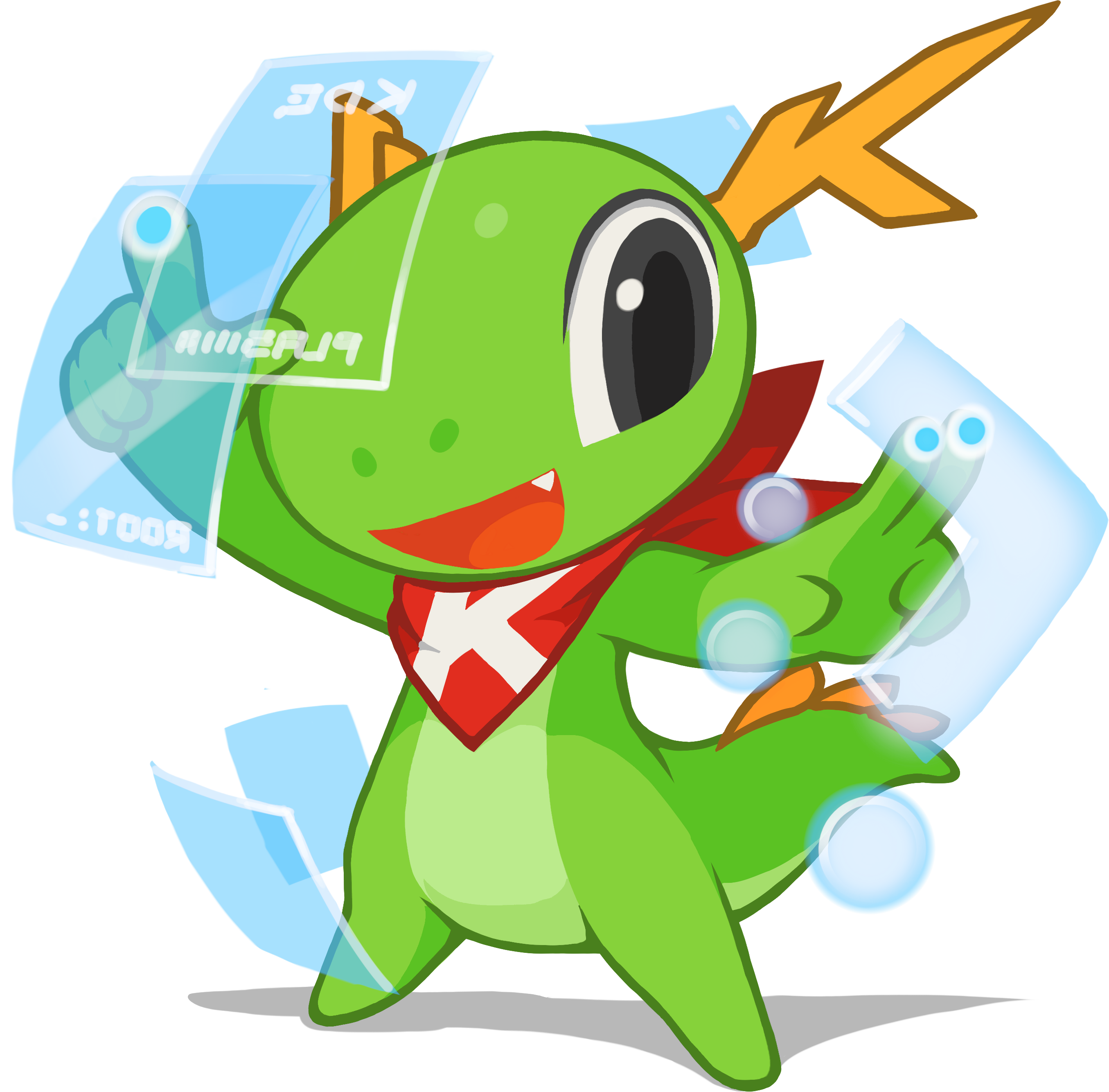
KDE's mascot Konqi and Plasma desktop

=== Software architecture ===
KDE Plasma 5 is built using Qt 5 and KDE Frameworks 5. It improves support for HiDPI displays and ships a convergent graphical shell, which can adjust itself according to the device in use. 5.0 also includes a new default theme, dubbed Breeze. Qt 5's QtQuick 2 uses a hardware-accelerated OpenGL(ES) scene graph (canvas) to compose and render graphics on the screen, which allows for the offloading of computationally expensive graphics rendering tasks onto the GPU, freeing up resources on the system's main CPU.

=== Windowing systems ===
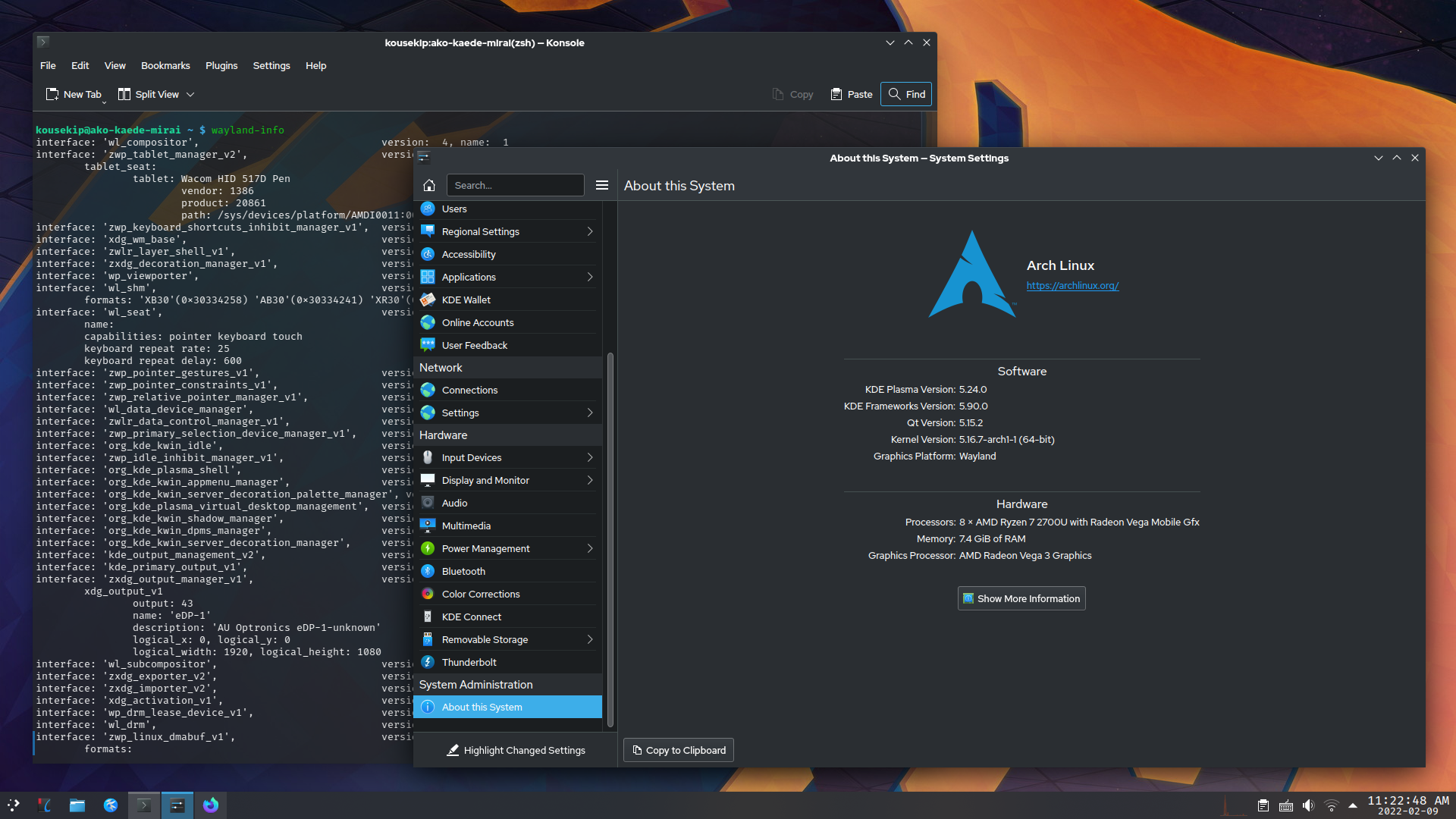
KDE Plasma 5 running under Wayland

KDE Plasma 5 uses the X Window System and Wayland. Support for Wayland was prepared in the compositor and planned for a later release. It was made initially available in the 5.4 release. Stable support for a basic Wayland session was provided in the 5.5 release (December 2015).

Support for NVIDIA proprietary driver for Plasma on Wayland was added in the 5.16 release (June 2019).

=== Development ===
Since the split of the KDE Software Compilation into KDE Plasma, KDE Frameworks and KDE Applications, each subproject can develop at its own pace. KDE Plasma 5 is on its own release schedule, with feature releases every four months, and bugfix releases in the intervening months.

=== Workspaces ===
The latest Plasma 5 features the following workspaces:

- Plasma Desktop for any mouse or keyboard driven computing devices like desktops or laptops
- Plasma Mobile for smartphones
- Plasma Bigscreen for TVs and set-top boxes incl. voice interaction
- Plasma Nano, a minimal shell for embedded and touch-enabled devices, like IoT or automotive

== Desktop features ==
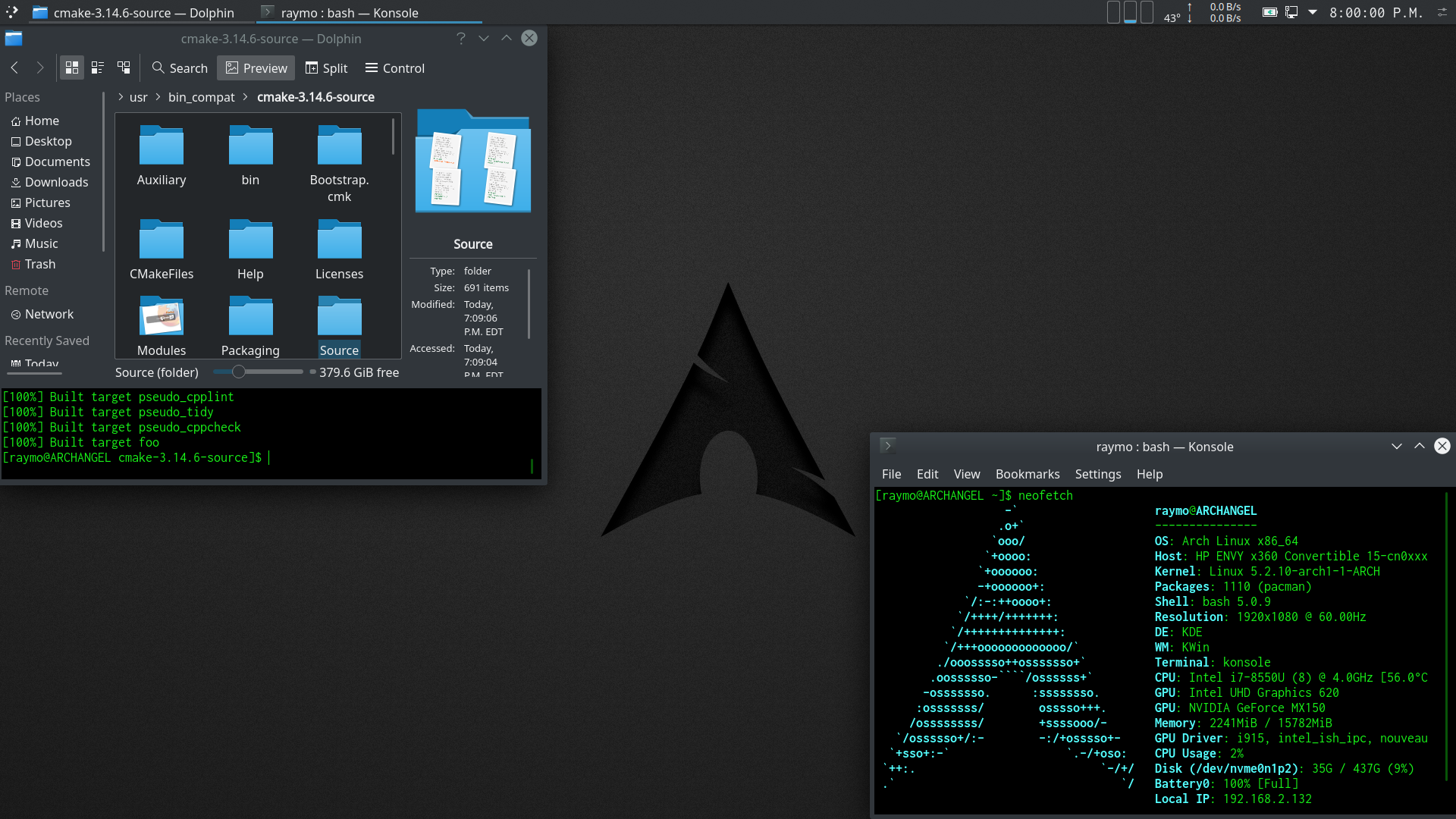
KDE Plasma with the Breeze Dark theme, with Konsole and Dolphin, core KDE applications

- KRunner, a search feature with many available plugins. In addition to launching apps, it can find files and folders, open websites, convert from one currency or unit to another, calculate simple mathematical expressions, and perform numerous other useful tasks.
- Flexible desktop and panel layouts composed of individual Widgets (also known as "Plasmoids") which can be individually configured, moved around, replaced with alternatives, or deleted. Each screen's layout can be individually configured. New widgets created by others can be downloaded within Plasma.
- Clipboard with a memory of previously-copied pieces of text that can be called up at will.
- System-wide notification system supporting quick reply and drag-and-drop straight from notifications, history view, and a Do Not Disturb mode.
- Central location to control playback of media in open apps, the phone (with KDE Connect installed), or the web browser (with Plasma Browser Integration installed)
- Activities, which allow users to separate methods of using the system into distinct workspaces. Each activity can have its own set of favorite and recently used applications, wallpapers, "virtual desktops", panels, window styles, and layout configurations. It also couples with ksmserver (X Session Manager implementation) which keeps track of apps that can be run or shutdown along with given activity via subSessions functionality that keep track of state of applications (not all applications support this feature as they do not implement XSMP protocol).
- Encrypted vaults for storing sensitive data.
- Night Color, which can automatically warm the screen colors at night, or user-specified times, or manually.
- Styling for icons, cursors, application colors, user interface elements, splash screens and more can be changed, with new styles created by others being downloadable from within the System Settings application. Global Themes allow the entire look and feel of the system to be changed in one click.
- Session Management allows apps which were running when the system shut down to be automatically restarted in the same state they were in before.

== History ==
The first Technology Preview of Plasma 5 (at that time called Plasma 2) was released on 13 December 2013. On 15 July 2014, the first release version – Plasma 5.0 – was released. In spring 2015, Plasma 5 replaced Plasma 4 in many popular distributions, such as Fedora 22, Kubuntu 15.04, and openSUSE Tumbleweed.

=== Releases ===
Feature releases are released every four months (up to 5.8 every three months) and bugfix releases in the intervening months. Following version 5.8 LTS KDE plans to support each new LTS version for 18 months with bug fixes, while new regular releases will see feature improvements.

Plasma 5 releases
Version	Date	Key features
5.0	15 Jul 2014	First release.
5.1	15 Oct 2014	Ported missing features from Plasma 4.
5.2	27 Jan 2015	New components: BlueDevil – integrates Bluetooth technology within Plasma and KDE Applications; KSSHAskPass – front-end for ssh-add which stores the password of the ssh key in KWallet; Muon – a collection of package management tools for Debian-based systems, using the apt-xapian index and the Synaptic search algorithm; sddm-kcm – config module for SDDM themes; KScreen – screen management software Hooks into KDE System Settings, makes use of KDE Daemon and KGlobalAccel; kde-gtk-config – GTK 2 and 3 style configurator; KDecoration – a plugin-based library to create window decorations. These window decorations can be used by window manager which re-parents a client window to a window decoration frame.
5.3	28 Apr 2015	Tech preview of Plasma Media Center. New Bluetooth and touchpad applets. Enhanced power management.
5.4	25 Aug 2015	Initial Wayland session. New QML-based audio volume applet. Alternative full-screen application launcher.
5.5	8 Dec 2015	Improved Wayland support.
5.6	22 Mar 2016	Increased security.
5.7	5 Jul 2016	"basic workflows now fully functional" in the Plasma Wayland session. Automatic virtual keyboard.
5.8 LTS	4 Oct 2016	Long Term Support version.
5.9	31 Jan 2017	Wayland improvements. Global menu support.
5.10	30 May 2017	Performance improvements.
5.11	7 Nov 2017	System Settings redesign. Notification history. Added Plasma Vaults. Wayland improvements.
5.12 LTS	6 Feb 2018	Increased stability and speed. Wayland improvements.
5.13	12 Jun 2018	Integration with non-KDE web browsers. New lock and login screen designs. Improved Discover appearance. New screen layout selection dialog upon connection of a new screen.
5.14	9 Oct 2018	GTK global menu integration. Wayland improvements.
5.15	12 Feb 2019	Support for virtual desktops, touch drag-and-drop, and the XdgStable, XdgPopups and XdgDecoration protocols in the Plasma Wayland session.
5.16	11 Jun 2019	Revamped notification system with Do Not Disturb feature, grouping in history, critical notifications in fullscreen apps, and better file transfer progress notifications. Support for the NVIDIA proprietary driver on Wayland. Full support for WireGuard VPNs. Full touchpad configurability on X11 with Libinput driver. Modernized login, lock, and logout screen designs. UI improvements throughout Plasma and Discover
5.17	15 Oct 2019	Night Color available for X11. Plasma now recognizes when a program is running in full-screen mode and prevents pop-ups. Fractional scaling support in the Plasma Wayland session.
5.18 LTS	11 Feb 2020	Easier system settings. Interactive notifications. New Emoji picker. New wallpapers. Improved GTK app integration.
5.19	9 Jun 2020	New system monitoring widgets. New Info Center app. Improved System Tray visuals and interaction. Timezones visible in clock pop-up. Inline reply function for notifications from supported apps. Global animation speed setting.
5.20	13 Oct 2020	S.M.A.R.T. disk monitoring. "Highlight changed settings" feature in System Settings. Digital clock applet shows date by default. Redesigned status OSDs. More options and improvements for switching between grouped Task Manager tasks. Window corner-tiling shortcuts. Adjustable per-channel audio balance. Middle-click on notifications icon to enter Do Not Disturb mode. Support for screencasting, shared clipboard, middle-click paste, window thumbnails, and adjusting the scrolling speed in the Plasma Wayland session.
5.21	16 Feb 2021	New application launcher. Applications theme improvements (unified headerbar). Breeze Twilight, a new variant of Breeze with a mix of dark and light colors. New Plasma System Monitor app. New Plasma Firewall settings page and improvements to System Settings. Media Player applet's includes the list of applications currently playing music in the header as a tab bar. Support for virtual keyboards in GTK applications in the Plasma Wayland session.
5.22	8 Jun 2021	Adaptive Transparency for panels. Many style improvements and bug fixes for widgets and KRunner. Stability improvements for the Plasma Wayland session.
5.23	14 Oct 2021	Switch between different performance/power saving modes (on supported hardware). Overhauled visual style for the Breeze theme. Customizable accent color. Bluetooth enablement status configurable and remembered across reboots by default. Easier to search for settings in System Settings. Application launch feedback animations and stability improvements for the Plasma Wayland session.
5.24 LTS	8 Feb 2022	New Overview manager to more easily switch between desktops. Visual refresh for the Breeze theme. Color picker for accent colors. Accent for critical notifications. System tray widget enhancements. Speed and productivity enhancements to Discover. Help integration into KRunner. Fingerprint authentication support. Additional support for colors, VR, and drawing tables in Plasma Wayland.
5.25	14 Jun 2022	Overview manager displays all open windows and virtual desktops. Trackpad gesture support. Sync accent color to the wallpaper. New touch mode with resized elements. New customization options. Reworked Discover application page. Greater global theme options
5.26	11 Oct 2022	Resizable panel widgets. New timer widget. New Aura browser and Plank media player for Plasma Big Screen. Enhancements to Night Color. Sharper scaled text on XWayland applications. Wallpaper changes alongside dark mode. Dismiss notifications with middle click.
5.27 LTS	14 Feb 2023	Welcome wizard, window tiling system, a more stylish app theme, cleaner and more usable tools, the ability to control Flatpak permissions in Discover (similar to Flatseal), additional widgets for users to control their machine
Unsupported Latest version

== See also ==
- GNOME
- Comparison of X Window System desktop environments

== Gallery ==
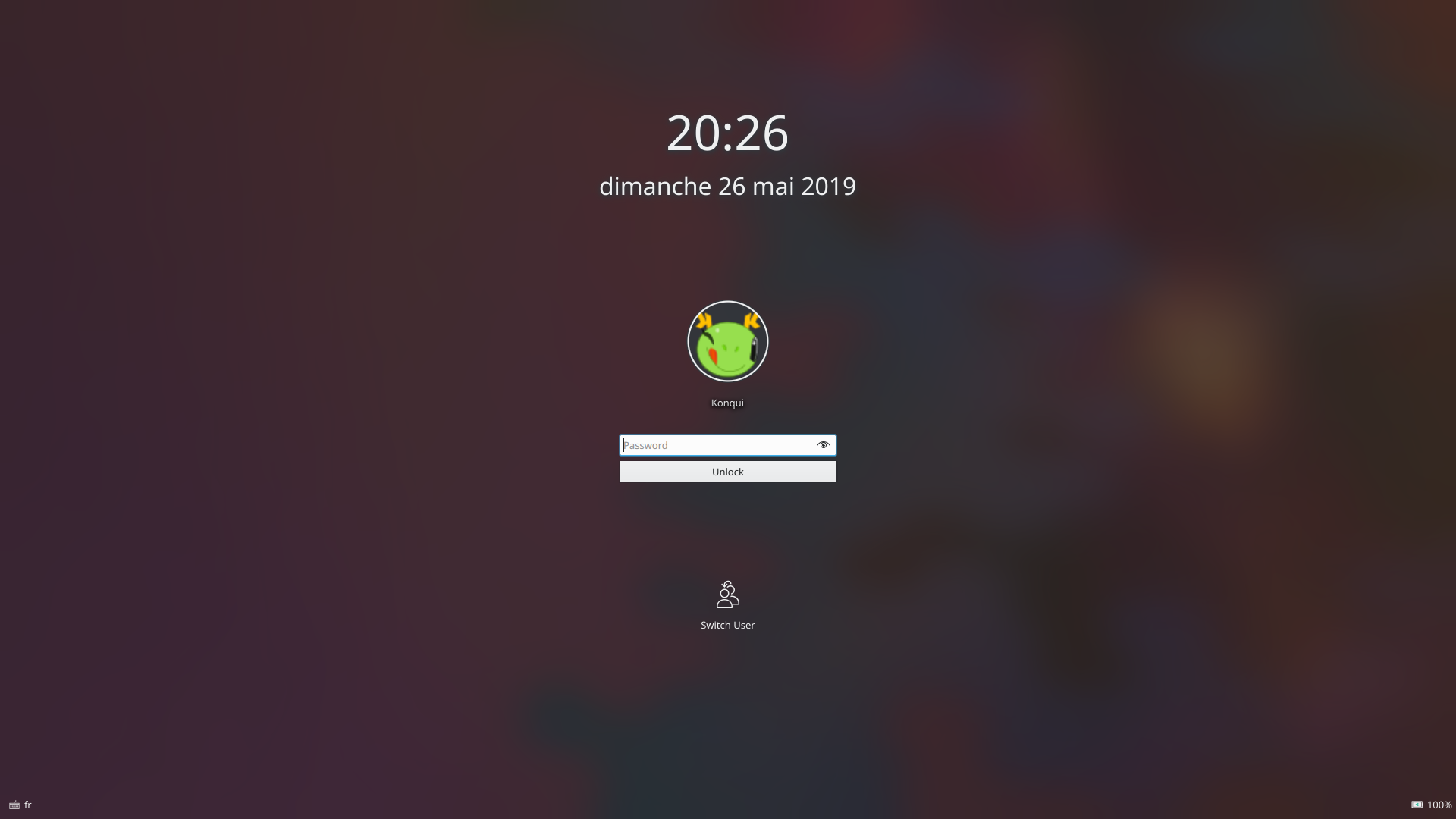
Default lock screen of Plasma 5

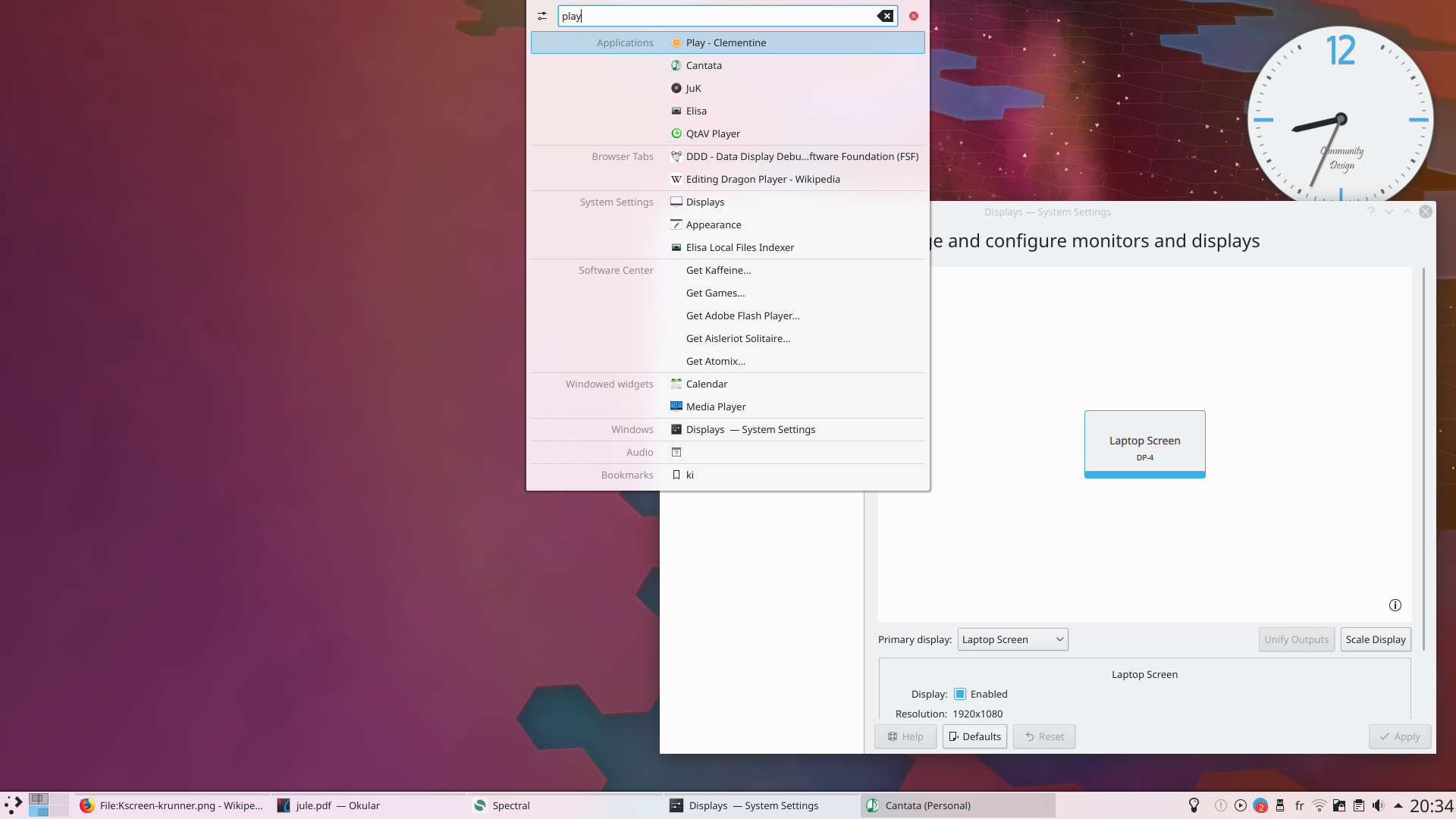
Plasma 5 showing KRunner and display management

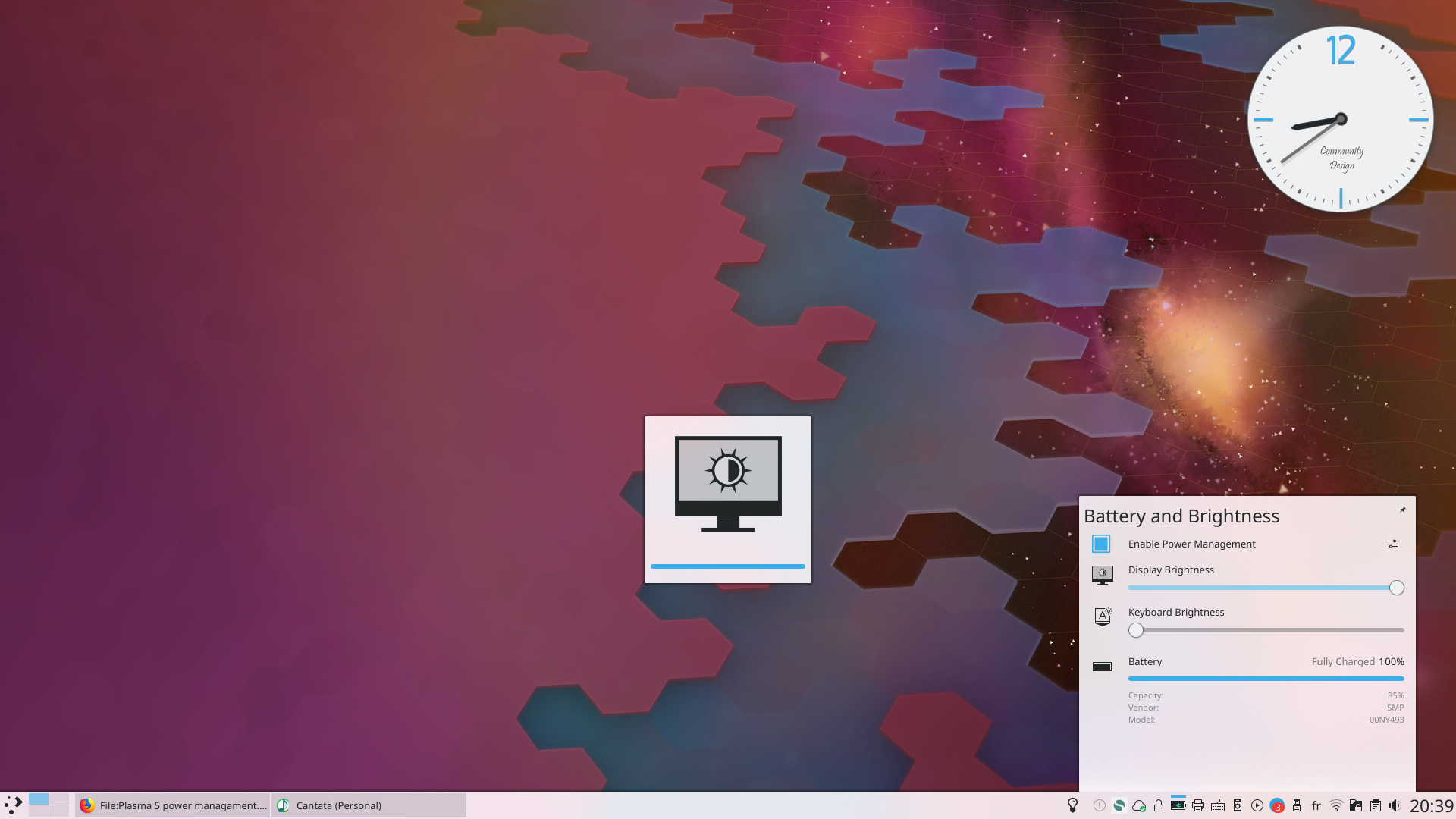
Power management and keyboard brightness OSD

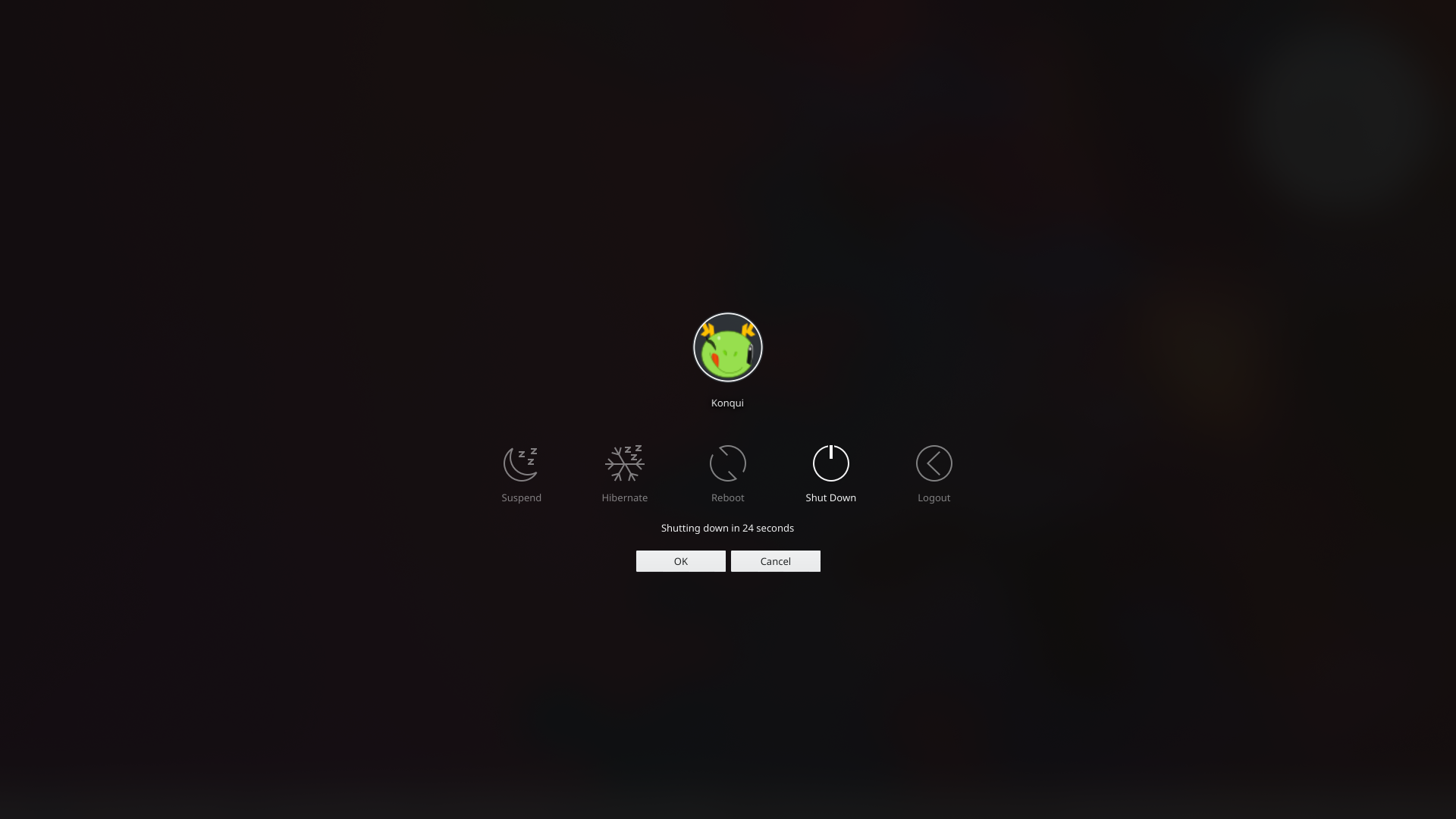
Shutdown screen of Plasma 5

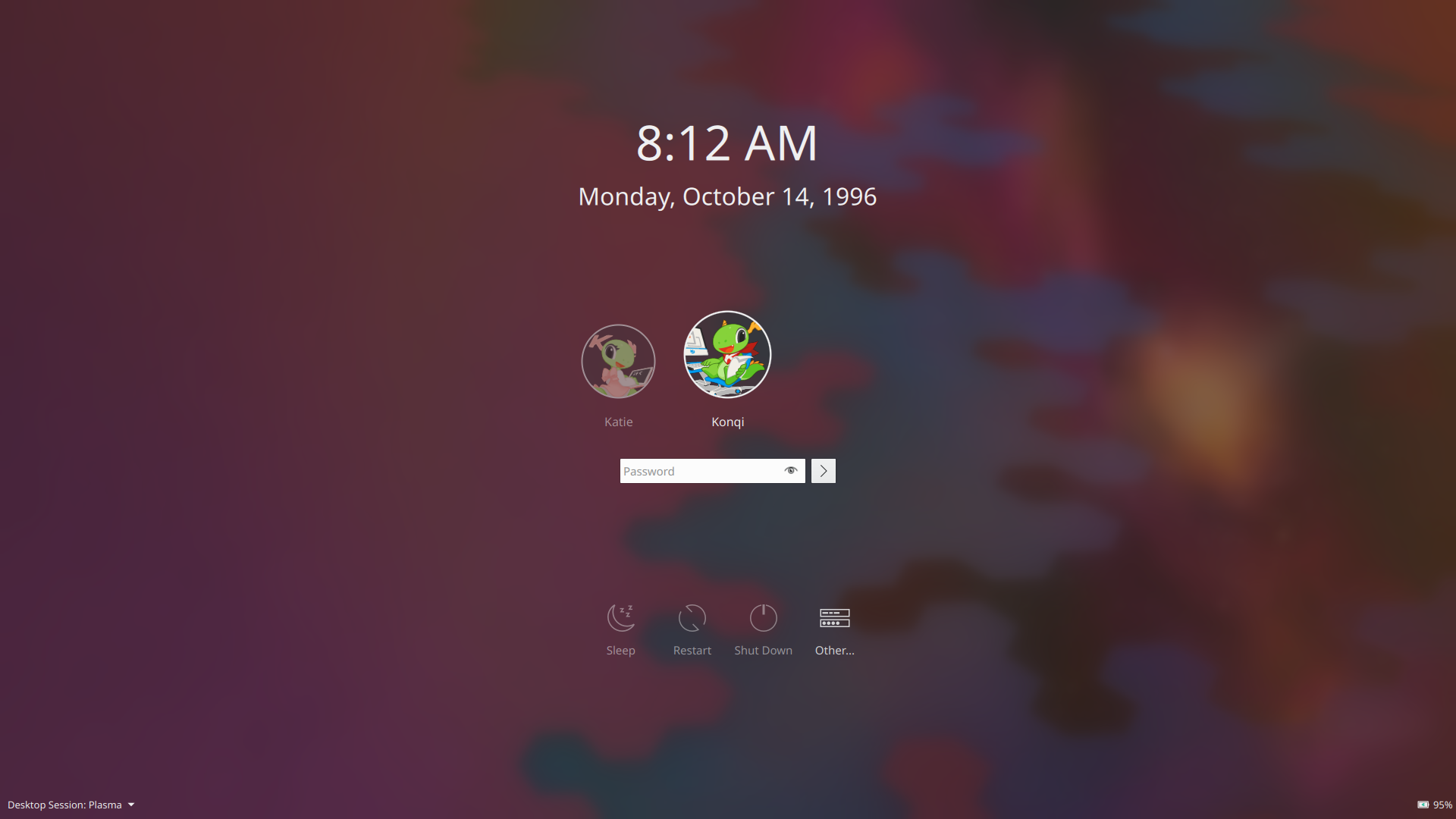
Login screen of Plasma 5

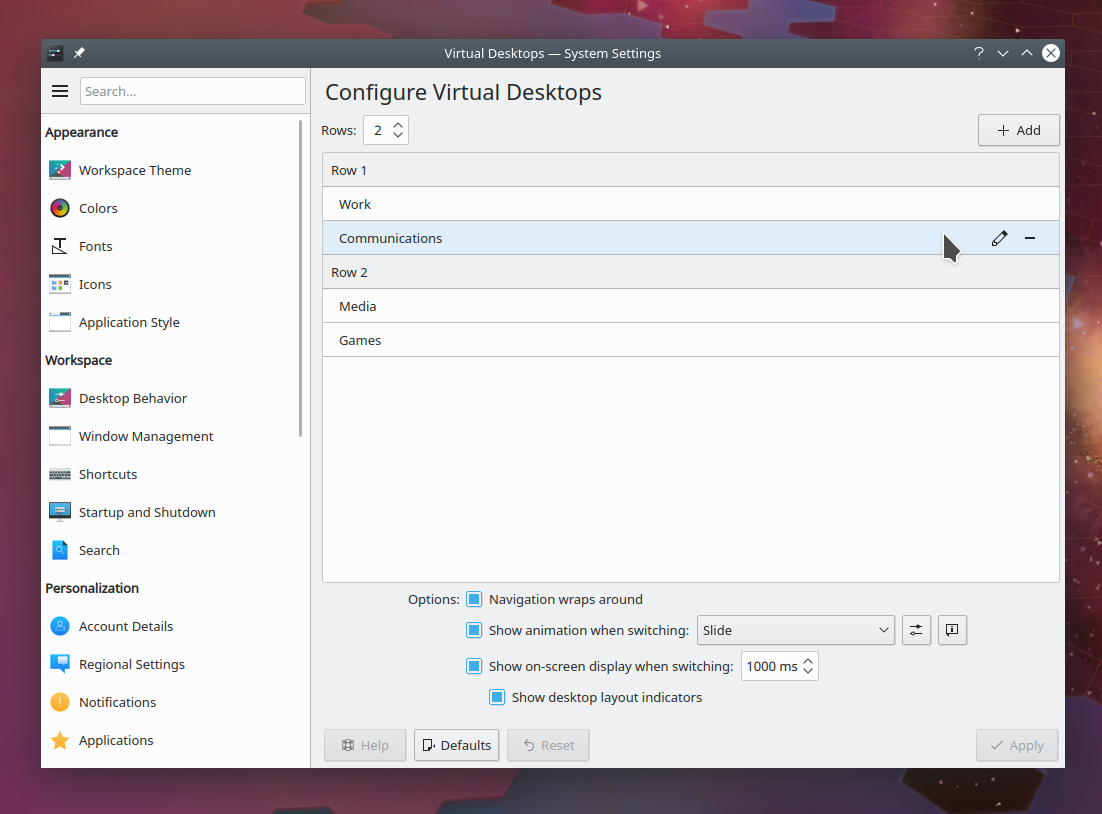
Plasma System Settings
