= Simple Desktop Display Manager =

Display manager for X11 and Wayland

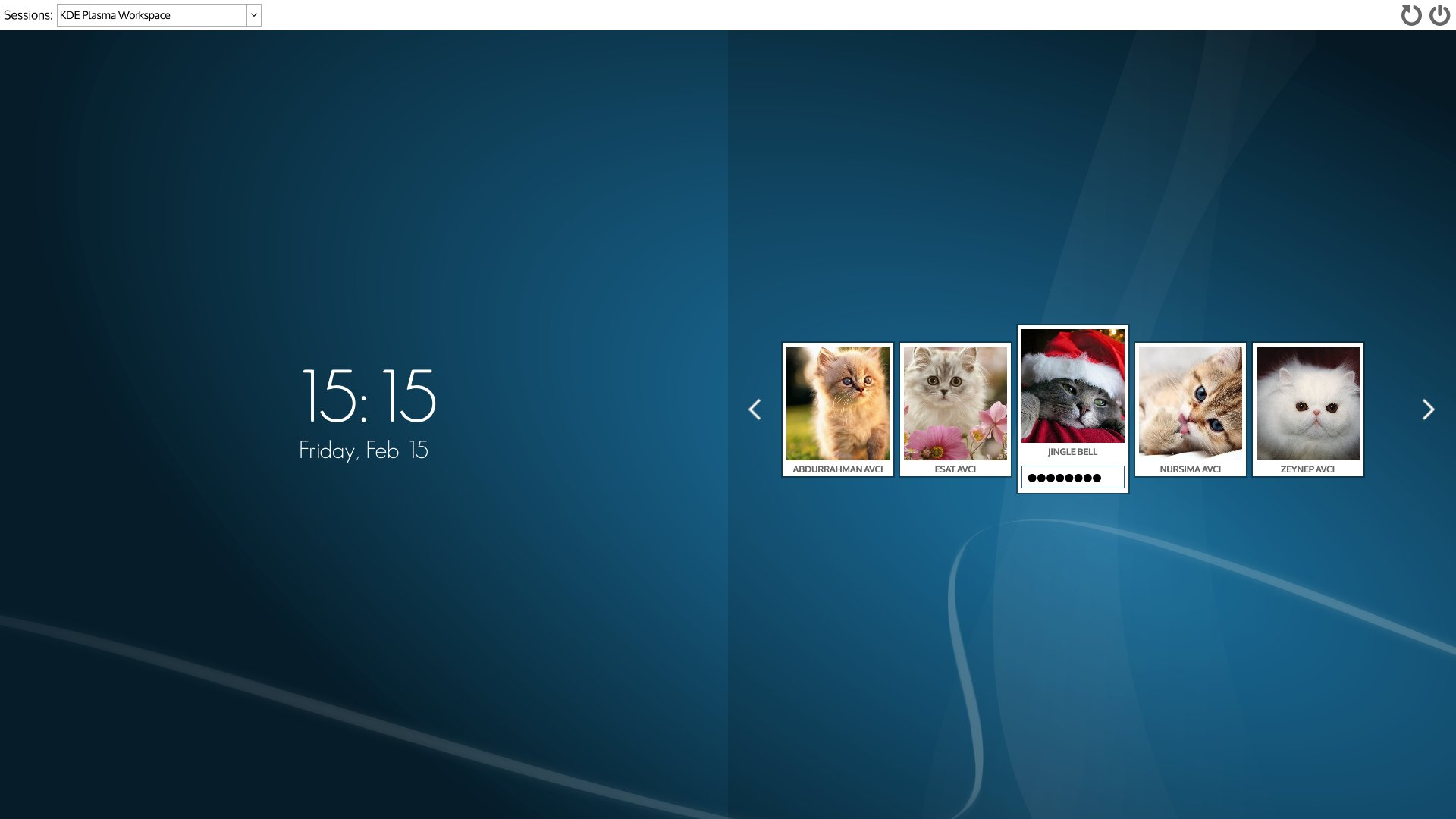
- Original author: Abdurrahman Avci
- Developers: Abdurrahman Avci, KDE, LXQt, Liri
- Release: 19 March 2013; 13 years ago
- Stable release: 0.21.0 / 26 February 2024; 2 years ago
- Written in: C++, QML
- Platform: Unix-like
- Type: X display manager
- License: GPL-2.0-or-later
- Website: github.com/sddm/sddm
- Repository: github.com/sddm/sddm

Simple Desktop Display Manager (SDDM) is a display manager (a graphical login program) for the X11 and Wayland windowing systems. SDDM was written from scratch in C++11 and supports theming via QML.

SDDM is free and open-source software subject to the terms of the GNU General Public License version 2 or later.

== Adoption ==
In 2013, Fedora KDE members decided to default to SDDM in Fedora 21.

KDE chose SDDM to be the successor of the KDE Display Manager for KDE Plasma 5. In 2023, KDE forked SDDM to form the basis of the new Plasma Login Manager, which became KDE's default login manager starting with Plasma 6.6.

The LXQt developers recommend SDDM as a display manager.

== See also ==
- LightDM, Light display manager, formerly written for Ubuntu, now independent
- GDM, the default graphical login program for GNOME
