= Entrance (display manager) =

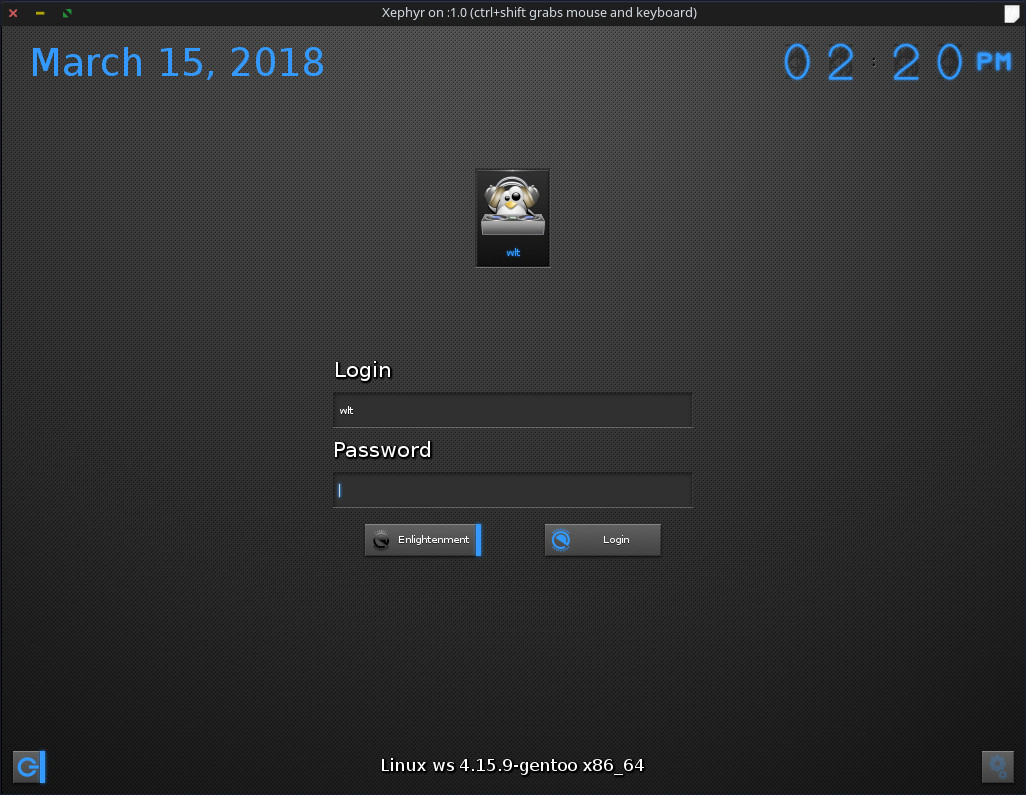
A screenshot of the default theme for Entrance in testing mode.

Entrance /ɛnˈtræns/ is a display manager for the X Window System. It is written using the Enlightenment Foundation Libraries, a graphical toolkit written in C.

Entrance is themeable, and is capable of launching different desktop environments from a list, as well as remembering users for auto-login. It also allows animation and visual effects. Customization is achieved by editing a database located in /etc/entrance/entrance.conf by default.

Development of Entrance was started around 2003 by Ibukun Olumuyiwa in order to create a successor to a program called Elogin. The project went on hiatus in 2005. On 9 August 2012, development was restarted by Michael Bouchaud, who renamed his previous display manager ("Elsa") to Entrance. That project also went on hiatus in 2015-2016. In 2017 development was restarted by William L. Thomson Jr. by forking Entrance.

The name of Entrance may be a play on words, as the correct pronunciation hints at putting the user in a trance, though it is also the "entrance" to the graphical desktop.

== See also ==
- Other display managers
- Enlightenment (software)
