= Getty (software) =

Unix software to manage physical or virtual terminals

getty
- Developer: Ken Thompson
- Written in: C
- Operating system: UNIX / FreeBSD
- License: Various

getty, short for "get teletype", is a Unix program running on a host computer that manages physical or virtual terminals (TTYs). When it detects a connection, it prompts for a username and runs the 'login' program to authenticate the user.

Originally, on traditional Unix systems, getty handled connections to serial terminals (often Teletype machines) connected to a host computer. The tty part of the name stands for Teletype, but has come to mean any type of text terminal. One getty process serves one terminal. In some systems, for example, Solaris, getty was replaced by ttymon.

Personal computers running Unix-like operating systems, even if they do not provide any remote login services, may still use getty as a means of logging in on a local virtual console.

Instead of the login program, getty may also be set up by the system administrator to run any other program, for example pppd (point-to-point protocol daemon) to provide a dial-up Internet connection.

== See also ==
- List of Unix commands
- BusyBox, that provides a getty
- GNU Core Utilities (implements stty)
- util-linux, that provides a getty
