= OtherOS =

PlayStation 3 feature

OtherOS is a feature of early versions of Sony Computer Entertainment's PlayStation 3 video game console, allowing user-installed software, such as Linux or FreeBSD. Software running in the OtherOS environment has access to 6 of the 7 Synergistic Processing Elements. Sony implemented a hypervisor that restricts access to the RSX Reality Synthesizer graphics chip. IBM provided an introduction to programming parallel applications on the PlayStation 3.

The feature was controversially removed by Sony since system firmware update 3.21, released on April 1, 2010. A class action lawsuit was filed against Sony on behalf of users, but was dismissed with prejudice in 2011 by a federal judge. The judge stated: "As a legal matter, ... plaintiffs have failed to allege facts or articulate a theory on which Sony may be held liable." However, this decision was overturned in a 2014 appellate court decision finding that plaintiffs had indeed made clear and sufficiently substantial claims. Ultimately, in 2016, Sony settled with users who had installed Linux or had purchased a PlayStation 3 based upon the availability of OtherOS.

The settlement was then rejected in February 2017 by judge Yvonne Gonzalez Rogers, citing two problems: the lawyers' high fee percentage, and the users' difficulty in collecting. Sony responded in September 2017, offering each member of a single proposed class up to $65. This is a change from $55 and $9 payouts for members of two separate classes in the prior proposal.

== History ==
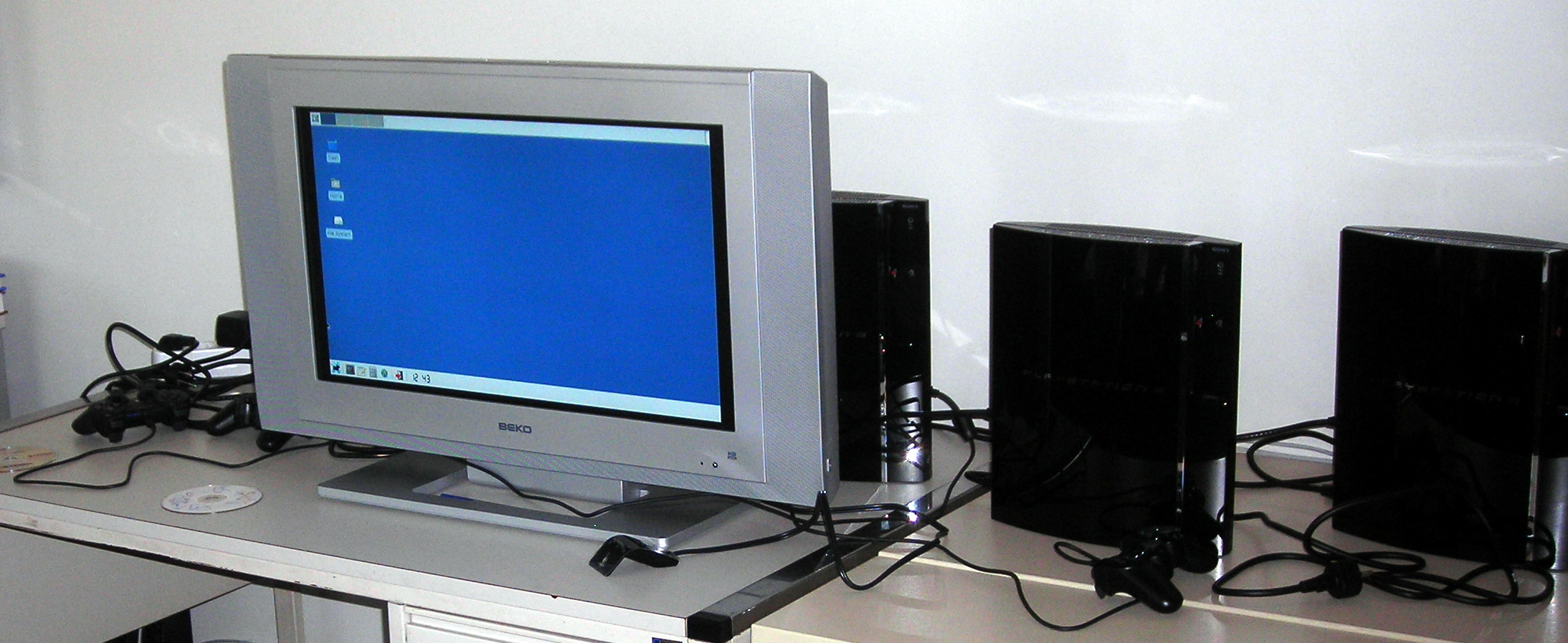
A cluster of PlayStation 3s running a Linux operating system

Since 2000, Sony has marketed Linux on the PlayStation 2. It promoted the release of the PS2 Linux Kit, which includes a Linux-based operating system, a USB keyboard and mouse, a VGA adapter, a PlayStation 2 Ethernet network adapter, and a 40 GB hard disk drive (HDD).

The PlayStation 3 does not have Linux pre-installed. However, Sony included an option in the XMB menu soon after the PlayStation 3 launched that allowed booting into Linux from the hard drive or from a Live CD that the distributor's kernel would boot. The installation manual for the Yellow Dog Linux version for PS3 stated, "It was fully intended that you, a PS3 owner, could play games, watch movies, view photos, listen to music, and run a full-featured Linux operating system that transforms your PS3 into a home computer."

Sony announcement of the upcoming release of the PS3 Slim in September 2009, stated that it would not support the OtherOS feature, without any explanation. In March 2010, Sony announced that OtherOS would be removed due to security concerns, as of PS3 Firmware 3.21 on April 1, 2010.

Several methods of bypassing the updating and retaining the ability to sign into PlayStation Network have been discovered, most of which use third party DNS servers.

George Hotz claimed to have created custom firmware for the PS3 called 3.21OO that re-enables OtherOS and published a video as proof. Some in the online community claim that this custom firmware was a hoax. On July 14, 2010, Hotz announced that he would not bring out his custom firmware to the PlayStation 3.

On April 27, 2010, a class action lawsuit was filed in California. It claimed that the removal of the OtherOS feature was "unfair and deceptive" and a "breach of good faith". Most of the filing relates to violation of various consumer protection laws relating to the removal. Several other lawsuits were also filed and are somewhat similar in nature but are filed by other individuals.

In January 2011, Sony sued Hotz and members of fail0verflow for their jailbreaking of the PS3. Charges included violating the DMCA, the CFAA, copyright law, and California's CCDAFA, and for breach of contract (related to the PlayStation Network User Agreement), tortious interference, misappropriation, and trespass.

In February, 2011, U.S. District Judge Richard Seeborg dismissed most of the class claims with leave to amend, finding the plaintiffs failed to state a claim. Seeborg stated: "While it cannot be concluded as a matter of law at this juncture that Sony could, without legal consequence, force its customers to choose either to forego installing the software update or to lose access to the other OS feature, the present allegations of the complaint largely fail to state a claim. Accordingly, with the exception of one count, the motion to dismiss will be granted, with leave to amend."

On May 4, 2011, Youness Alaoui from the PS3MFW team announced the release of a modified PS3 firmware that allows running OtherOS.

On December 8, 2011, U.S. District Judge Richard Seeborg dismissed the last remaining count of the class action lawsuit, stating: "As a legal matter, ... plaintiffs have failed to allege facts or articulate a theory on which Sony may be held liable."

In January 2014 the U.S. Court of Appeals for the Ninth Circuit partially reversed the dismissal and sent the case back to the district court.

In 2016, Sony settled with American users who installed Linux or purchased a PlayStation 3 based upon the alternative OS functionality. This settlement provided a payment of $55 to those owners who used an alternative OS and/or $9 for purchasing a PlayStation based upon the option.

The settlement was then rejected in February 2017 by judge Yvonne Gonzalez, citing two problems. The first was the percentage being charged by the lawyers and the second involved the hurdles faced by those eligible to collect. Sony responded in September 2017, offering members of a single proposed class up to $65. This is a change from $55 and $9 payouts for members of two separate classes in the prior proposal.

In November 2018 final payouts for members of the class were sent in the amount of $10.07.

== Linux kernel ==
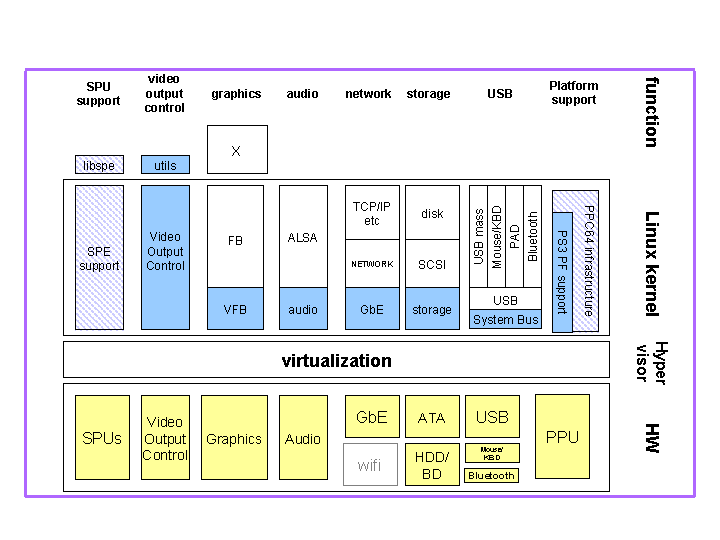
Diagram of the Linux kernel on the PlayStation 3

Linux supported PlayStation 3 with version 2.6.21. No patches or modifications are required. A simple Linux add-on CD for the PS3 includes support for Fedora 8 and other operating systems that already claim to install natively on the PS3. However, there is currently an issue with the latest kboot boot loader provided by kernel.org. Once the user selects the default action, the USB ports are de-registered on some systems. A work-around is available at PSUbuntu.

== Distributions ==
Debian, Fedora 8, Gentoo, OpenSUSE (10.3 to 11.1), and Ubuntu run on the PlayStation 3. Yellow Dog Linux for the PlayStation 3 was first released in late 2006.

=== Ubuntu ===
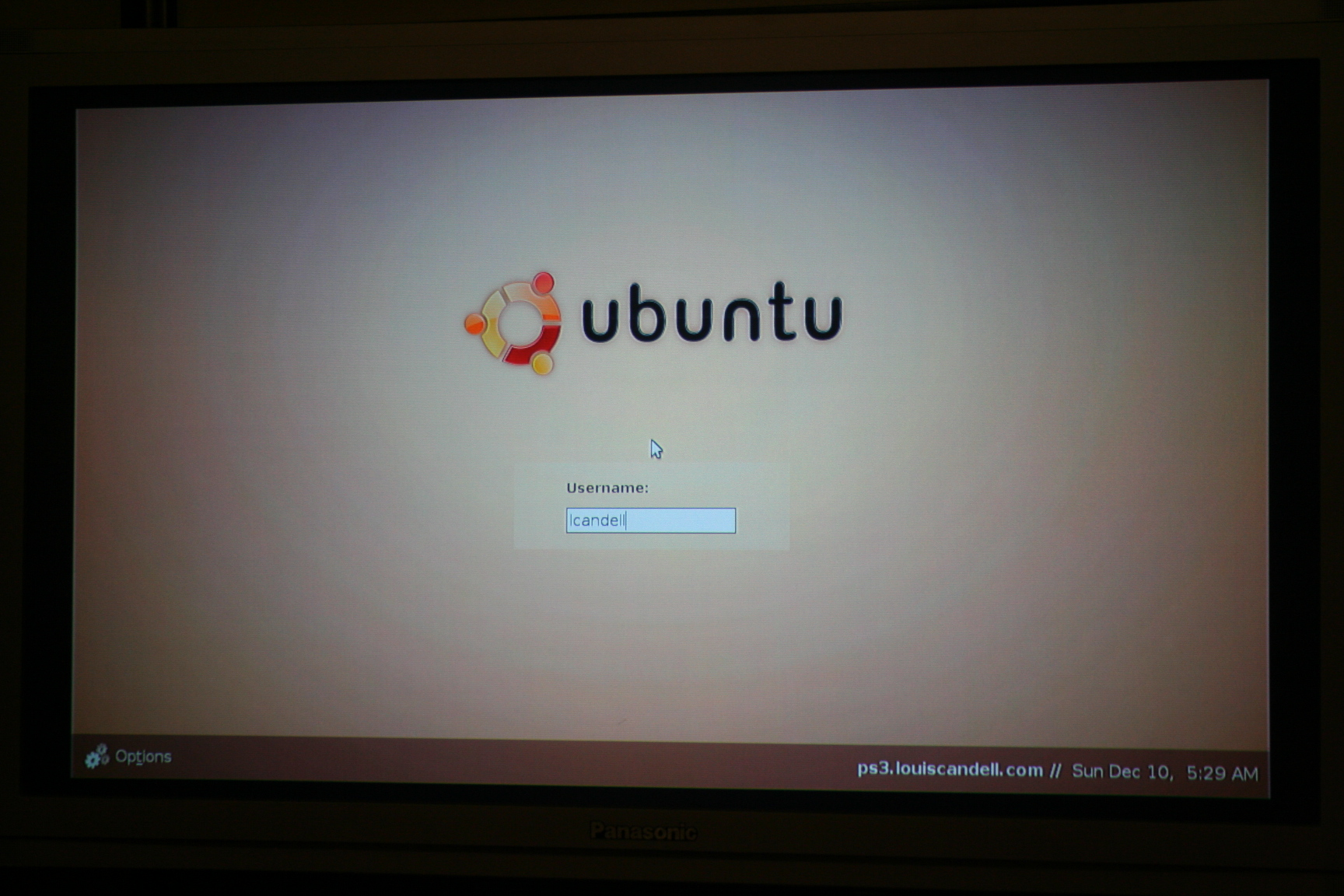
Ubuntu 6.10 on a PS3

Some versions of Ubuntu up to the release 10.10 have been ported to the PS3 platform. The installer cannot run in Live mode when running in 480i or 480p video resolutions, but it offers a text-based installer that installs fully functional Ubuntu. It is possible to mount an external USB hard drive as the home folder during install.

The LTS release 8.04 (Hardy Heron) of Ubuntu is incompatible with the PS3. However the 8.10 (Intrepid Ibex) release was ported to the PS3 on the same release date as the official main Ubuntu release.

=== Yellow Dog Linux ===
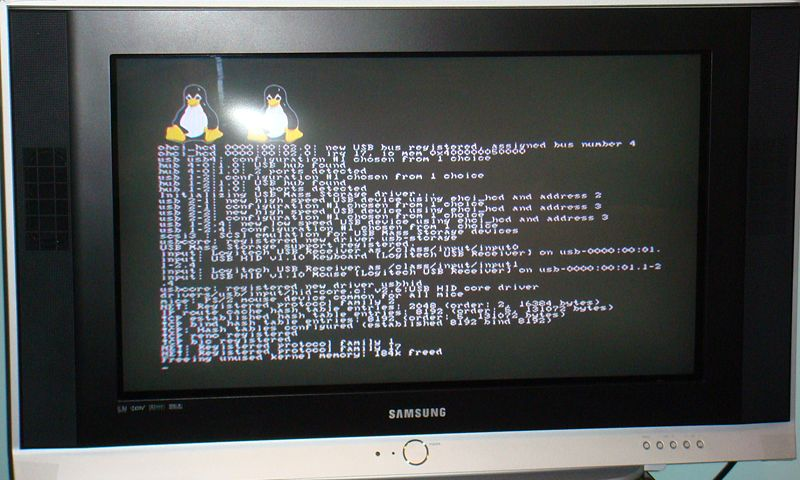
Yellow Dog Linux running on a PS3

Yellow Dog Linux 5.0 was one of the first Linux distributions to run on Sony's PlayStation 3 platform. It is designed specifically for HDTV so users with SDTV will have to use the commands 'installtext' and 'ydl480i' to install and run.

Yellow Dog Linux is based on the Red Hat Enterprise Linux/CentOS core and relies on the RPM Package Manager. Digital audio has been verified to function properly, however, the Nvidia graphics card is not supported beyond framebuffer mode. In addition, some other hardware components will not function properly without modifications to the kernel. Wi-Fi function via the Network Manager is also not fully supported and must be entered manually via the Network Configuration tool, or in some cases, through the command shell. A workaround is available to enable wireless to be configured via the Network Manager.

=== openSUSE ===
openSUSE 10.3 was the first version of openSUSE to run on the Sony PlayStation 3 platform. openSUSE is a free version of SUSE Linux, which was then owned by Novell. There are PlayStation 3 specific installation instructions available for openSUSE.

Starting with openSUSE 11.2, support for the PowerPC architecture (and therefore the PlayStation 3) has been dropped.

=== Fedora ===
Fedora also ran on the PlayStation 3. Fedora 7 works on a USB external hard disk but fails to detect the internal disk, Fedora 9 detects the internal disk but not the USB disk, Fedora 8 will not work due to video "card" detection problems. Fedora 10 installs on the internal hard disk without any issues and works fine without having to change any settings.

Fedora 12 only installs on the PlayStation 3 when running the 64-bit kernel.

== RSX Homebrew ==
Linux on the PlayStation 3 allows for a range of homebrew programs to be developed. Although the Cell's performance is more than enough to handle most media requirements or render complex 3D graphics, it does lack the teraflops performance of a contemporary GPU's texture fetching hardware. For this reason many complex games are not possible on the PlayStation 3 through Linux, as access to hardware acceleration in the RSX is restricted by a hypervisor.

There have been developments in enabling access to the RSX through the Linux kernel and the X Window System. It is possible to use the RSX memory as swap space. A trick to access some 3D functions was blocked with firmware 2.10.

== AsbestOS ==
Reverse engineering advancements focused around a USB descriptor parsing vulnerability in 3.41 firmware, which allowed running the Linux kernel on 3.41 firmware. The current state of the project is the ability to load the Linux kernel via TFTP and run it with access to all 7 SPEs (requires applying a small patch to the kernel). The rest of the system can run on an NFS share - hard disk access is currently not implemented, as well as some other features.

Also, since the exploit runs the kernel with game privileges, graphics acceleration is now available, although it requires reworking of the nouveau driver code.

== FreeBSD ==
Support for PlayStation 3 was added to FreeBSD 9.0 in summer 2010. This support is limited to machines with OtherOS functionality still intact (firmware version 3.15 and earlier).

== See also ==
- Illegal number
- Computer Fraud and Abuse Act
- PlayStation 3 cluster
- Steam Deck, Machine, and Frame
