= California Comprehensive Computer Data Access and Fraud Act =

The California Comprehensive Computer Data Access and Fraud Act is in §502 of the California Penal Code.

According to the State Administrative Manual of California, the Act

affords protection to individuals, businesses, and governmental agencies from tampering, interference, damage, and unauthorized access to lawfully created computer data and computer systems. It allows for civil action against any person convicted of violating the criminal provisions for compensatory damages.

== Penalties Under the CCCDAFA ==
According to the California Comprehensive Computer Data Access and Fraud Act, violations of the law are subject to criminal penalties. For violating some of the more major premises of the Act, the punishment can be up to a $10,000 fine and a 3-year prison term.

== Notable cases ==
- 'People v. Hawkins' (2002)
  - Hawkins had source code from his previous employer on his home machine.
- 'Facebook v. ConnectU', LLC, (2007)
  - ConnectU gathered Facebook data using bots
- Facebook, Inc. v. Power Ventures, Inc.
  - Power Ventures scraped data from Facebook
- Facebook, Inc. v. John Does 1-10 (2007)
  - Various people, including some associated with Istra Holdings, scraped Facebook for data.
- SCEA v. George Hotz et al. (2011)
  - Jailbreaking of the PlayStation 3 by George Hotz & associates of fail0verflow

== See also ==
- Illegal number
- John Doe
- Mens rea
- Terms of service
