= Kilpatrick Townsend & Stockton =

American law firm

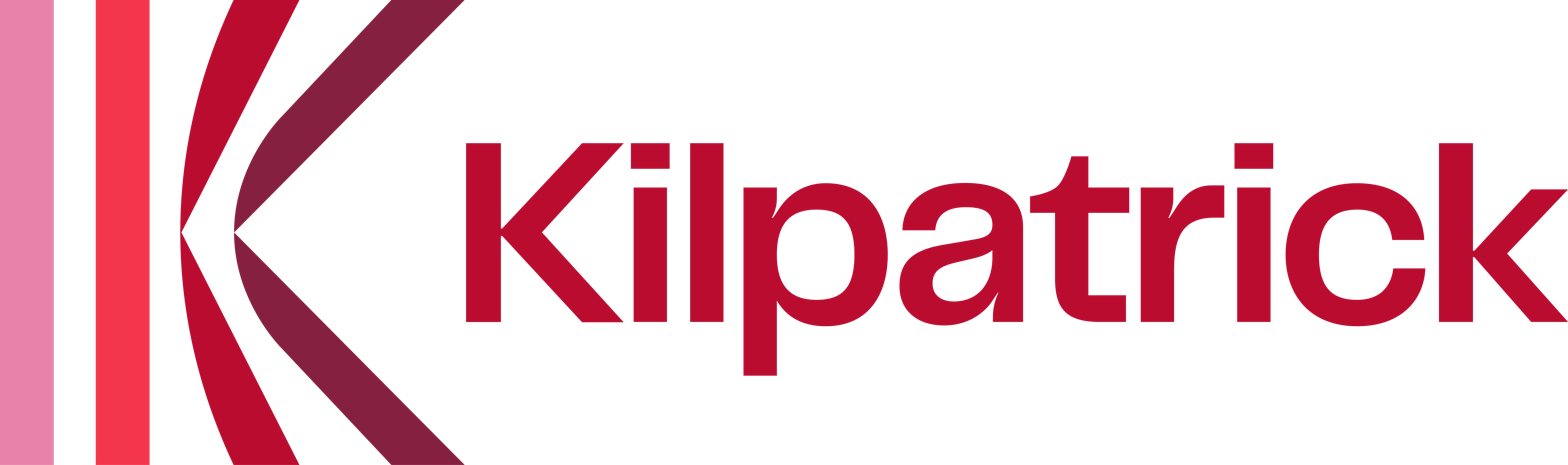
- Headquarters: Atlanta, Georgia, United States
- No. of offices: 22
- No. of attorneys: 650
- Major practice areas: Intellectual Property, Construction, Native American, Corporate, and Banking
- Date founded: 1860 (San Francisco, California)
- Company type: Limited liability partnership
- Website: ktslaw.com

Kilpatrick Townsend & Stockton is an American multinational law firm headquartered in Atlanta, Georgia. The firm has twenty-two offices, including U.S. offices in Arizona, California, Colorado, Illinois, New York, North Carolina, Texas, Washington State, and the District of Columbia, and has presence via international offices in Japan, Beijing, Shanghai, and Sweden. The firm is particularly known for its intellectual property practice. Clients have included Google in litigation related to its Google Print product, and Sony in its suit against 21-year-old hacker George Hotz for jailbreaking the PS3.

== History ==
In 1997, the firms Kilpatrick & Cody (founded, 1874 in Atlanta), and Petree Stockton (founded 1918 in Winston-Salem), merged to form Kilpatrick Stockton LLP.

On January 1, 2011, Kilpatrick Stockton, and Townsend and Townsend and Crew (founded in 1860) merged to form Kilpatrick Townsend & Stockton LLP.

=== Notable cases ===
In 2011, the firm assisted Sony in its lawsuit against George Hotz and some people associated with the group fail0verflow for "jailbreaking" the PlayStation 3. This included the attempted subpoena of Hotz's webhost to gather information about visitors to the site, as well as attempted subpoenas of YouTube, Twitter, Blogger and PayPal.

== Key people ==
- Ches McDowell is an attorney and former lobbyist with Kilpatrick, Townsend, & Stockton hired by Binance, to lobby US President Trump to consider pardoning their former CEO, Changpeng Zhao.

=== Partners ===
Kilpatrick Townsend & Stockton has over 250 partners. The firm's most notable partners include the following:

- Miles J. Alexander was the recipient of the International Trademark Association's 2002 President's Award.
  - Alexander was honored in 'The Best Lawyers in America 2006' for his prowess in the fields of Alternative Dispute Resolution, Antitrust Law, Corporate Law, and Intellectual Property Law.
- James Cain is a Former US Ambassador to Denmark and Former President of the NHL Team, Carolina Hurricanes
- Joseph M. Beck is known for representing clients in high-profile cases.
  - Beck is lead counsel for Google in the Google Print case, and he has represented the family of Martin Luther King Jr. in intellectual property matters.
  - Beck also defended the musical group OutKast in 1999, when OutKast was sued by Rosa Parks over one of the group's most successful radio singles, which bore Parks' name as its title.
  - In 2006, Beck was honored as one of 'The Best Lawyers in America' in the fields of Alternative Dispute Resolution, Entertainment Law, and Intellectual Property Law.
- William H. Brewster was named one of 'The Best Lawyers in America 2006' in the field of Intellectual Property Law.
- Adam Charnes served as the Principal Deputy Assistant Attorney General for the Office of Legal Policy at the United States Department of Justice. He also served as a law clerk to Supreme Court Justice Anthony M. Kennedy and to Judge J. Harvie Wilkinson III of the U.S. Court of Appeals for the Fourth Circuit.
- Keith Harper is one of the United States' leading Native American attorneys, and is no longer with the firm as of 2020.
  - Harper has been involved in the Cobell v. Kempthorne case since its inception. He first represented the plaintiffs while working at the Native American Rights Fund, before he joined Kilpatrick Stockton.
  - Harper is a member of the Cherokee Nation of Oklahoma, and serves as an appellate judge on the court of the Mashantucket Pequots.
- J. Henry Walker IV serves as the firm Chairman.
- David M. Zacks is a past chairman of the American Cancer Society.
  - Zacks was named one of 'The Best Lawyers in America 2006' in the fields of Alternative Dispute Resolution, Health Care Law, and Personal Injury Litigation.

== High-profile clients ==
- 20th Century Fox
- Adidas
- Apple
- AT&T
- Blue Cross and Blue Shield Association
- DaimlerChrysler
- Delta Air Lines
- DuPont
- Facebook
- Google
- Hanesbrands
- Krispy Kreme
- Levi Strauss & Co.
- Office Depot
- Oracle
- PepsiCo, Inc.
- Premera
- Sony
- Visa
- Wells Fargo
- Williams-Sonoma, Inc.
