= PlayStation 3 Jailbreak =

Removal of limitations from the PlayStation 3

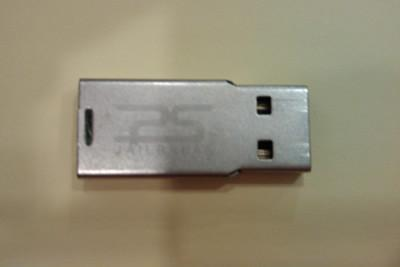
A PS Jailbreak USB dongle

PlayStation 3 Jailbreak was the first USB (Universal Serial Bus) chipset that allowed unauthorized execution of code, similar to homebrew, on the PlayStation 3. It works by bypassing a system security check using a memory exploit (heap overflow) which occurs with USB devices that allows the execution of unsigned code.

== Exploit ==
The PS Jailbreak device, first announced by an Australian retailer in August 2010, exploited a flaw in the PlayStation 3's USB device handling to execute arbitrary code in kernel space. The underlying exploit and inner workings of the PlayStation 3 Jailbreak were reverse engineered and reimplemented through the open source PSGroove. Through analysis of USB traffic to and from the PS3 Jailbreak, it was found that the device induced a heap overflow in kernel-space memory to trigger execution of untrusted code.

== Legality ==
Sony took steps to prevent jailbreaking of the PlayStation 3, treating the practice as a form of copyright infringement. The cases listed below are lawsuits Sony filed in courts to prohibit the sales and imports of circumvention devices that would jailbreak the system.

- In August 2010, Sony obtained an interim injunction from the Federal Court of Australia banning the sale, distribution, and importation of the PS Jailbreak device in Australia.
- Sony lost a lawsuit in December 2010 in Barcelona against the seller of PS Jailbreak. The sales and imports of the product were deemed legal within Spain, and Sony was ordered to pay damages for attempting to block them.
- In January 2011, Sony filed a lawsuit against George Hotz for leaking the encryption keys for the PlayStation 3. The case was settled in April 2011, with Hotz agreeing to a permanent injunction preventing him from circumventing any Sony product again. The court also approved that Sony's lawyers could obtain the IP addresses of visitors to Hotz's website.

== See also ==
- EdDSA
- Game backup device
- George Hotz
- Modchip
- PlayStation 3 homebrew
- PlayStation 3 system software
- Privilege escalation
