= Sony Computer Entertainment America, Inc. v. Hotz =

Lawsuit between Sony Entertainment and hackers geohot and fail0verflow

Sony Computer Entertainment America, Inc v. Hotz
- Court: United States District Court for the Northern District of California
- Full case name: Sony Computer Entertainment America, Inc. v. George Hotz, Hector Martin Cantero, Sven Peter, and Does 1 through 100
- Started: January 11, 2011
- Docket nos.: 3:11-cv-00167

Court membership
- Judges sitting: Susan Illston, Joseph C. Spero

Keywords
- 17:501 Copyright Infringement

SCEA v. Hotz was a lawsuit in the United States by Sony Computer Entertainment of America against George Hotz and associates of the group fail0verflow. It was in regards to jailbreaking and reverse engineering the PlayStation 3.

== Timeline ==
Free Speech Flag, PS3 variant, Yale Law Tech blog

On January 11, 2011, Sony Computer Entertainment of America sued George Hotz and fail0verflow members Hector Martin and Sven Peter on 8 claims, including violation of the Digital Millennium Copyright Act, computer fraud, and copyright infringement. The law firm hired by Sony was Kilpatrick Townsend & Stockton LLP. In response to the suit, Carnegie Mellon University professor David S. Touretzky mirrored Hotz's writings and issued a statement supporting that Hotz's publication is within his right to free speech.

On January 27, 2011, Sony's request for a temporary restraining order (TRO) was granted by the US District Court for the Northern District of California. This forbade him from distributing the jailbreak, helping or encouraging others to jailbreak, and distributing information they've learned during the creation of the jailbreak. It also ordered him to turn over computers and storage media used in the creation of the jailbreak to Sony's lawyers. Professor Touretzky's mirror was voluntarily censored following issue of the TRO, but Hotz's writings and software have been mirrored elsewhere.

On February 12, 2011, Hotz posted a one-minute diss track against Sony on his official YouTube channel in relation to the lawsuit.

On February 19, 2011, Hotz started a blog about the Sony lawsuit.

On March 6, 2011, the court issued an approval that Sony's lawyers were allowed access to all the IP addresses of all the people who visited geohot's blog for the purposes of establishing jurisdiction. Sony said the server logs would demonstrate that many of those who downloaded Hotz's hack reside in Northern California — thus making San Francisco a proper venue for the case.

On April 11, 2011, it was revealed that Hotz and Sony had reached a settlement out of court. This included a permanent injunction against Hotz doing any more hacking work on any Sony products to prevent any future firmware release from being decrypted.

The claims (filed in United States district court for Northern California, San Francisco) were:

- Violating the Digital Millennium Copyright Act (17 U.S.C. § 1201)
- Violating the Computer Fraud and Abuse Act (18 U.S.C. § 1030(a)(2)(c))
- Contributory copyright infringement (17 U.S.C. § 501)
- Violating California Comprehensive Computer Data Access and Fraud Act (§ 502)
- Breach of Contract (related to the PlayStation Network User Agreement)
- Tortious interference
- Misappropriation
- Trespass

== Alleged Anonymous attacks in response to lawsuit ==
In an act of hacktivism, Anonymous announced their intent to attack Sony websites in response to Sony's lawsuit and, specifically due to Sony's gaining access to the IP addresses of all the people who visited geohot's blog, terming it an 'offense against free speech and internet freedom'. Although Anonymous admitted responsibility to subsequent attacks on the Sony websites, much speculation has arisen concerning a sustained collapse of the PlayStation Network in April 2011. Anonymous has denied any involvement in the PlayStation Network outage. However, Sony announced on May 4, 2011, "We discovered that the intruders had planted a file on one of our Sony Online Entertainment servers named "Anonymous" with the words "We are Legion."

== See also ==
- Electronic Frontier Foundation
- George Hotz
- Groklaw
- Illegal number
- Strategic lawsuit against public participation
- Forum shopping
