= Illegal number =

Number representing illegal information

Free Speech Flag, from the HD DVD AACS case

An illegal number is a number that represents information which is illegal to possess, utter, propagate, or otherwise transmit in some legal jurisdiction. Any piece of digital information is representable as a number; consequently, if communicating a specific set of information is illegal in some way, then the number may be illegal as well.

== Background ==
A number may represent some type of classified information or trade secret, legal to possess only by certain authorized persons. An AACS encryption key (09 F9 11 02 9D 74 E3 5B D8 41 56 C5 63 56 88 C0) that came to prominence in May 2007 is an example of a number claimed to be a secret, and whose publication or inappropriate possession is claimed to be illegal in the United States. It assists in the decryption of any HD DVD or Blu-ray Disc released before this date. The issuers of a series of cease-and-desist letters claim that the key itself is therefore a copyright circumvention device, and that publishing the key violates Title 1 of the US Digital Millennium Copyright Act.

In part of the court order against a program, DeCSS, that decrypts the Content Scramble System and in the AACS legal notices, the claimed protection for these numbers is based on their mere possession and the value or potential use of the numbers. This makes their status and legal issues surrounding their distribution quite distinct from that of copyright infringement.

The PlayStation 3 edition of the Free Speech Flag

Any image file or an executable program can be regarded as simply a very large binary number, which can be converted into hexadecimal numbers, which are then converted into color hex codes. In certain jurisdictions, there are images that are illegal to possess, due to obscenity, child pornography, or secrecy/classified status, so the corresponding numbers could be illegal.

In 2011, Sony sued George Hotz and members of fail0verflow for jailbreaking the PlayStation 3. Part of the lawsuit complaint was that they had published PS3 keys. Sony also threatened to sue anyone who distributed the keys.

== Flags and steganography ==
The word Wikipedia translated into colors via interpreting ASCII hex codes as color hex codes

As a protest of the DeCSS case, many people created steganographic versions of the illegal information (i.e., hiding them in some form in flags etc.). Dave Touretzky of Carnegie Mellon University created the Gallery of DeCSS Descramblers. In the AACS encryption key controversy, a Free Speech Flag was created. Some illegal numbers are so short that a simple flag (shown in the image) could be created by using triples of components as describing red-green-blue colors. The argument is that if short numbers can be made illegal, then any representation of those numbers also becomes illegal, like simple patterns of colors, etc.

In the Sony Computer Entertainment v. Hotz case, many bloggers (including one at Yale Law School) made a "new free speech flag" in homage to the AACS Free Speech Flag. Most of these were based on the "dongle key" rather than the keys Hotz actually released. Several users of other websites posted similar flags.

== Illegal primes ==
An illegal prime is an illegal number which is also prime. One of the earliest illegal prime numbers was generated in March 2001 by Phil Carmody. Its binary representation corresponds to a gzip-compressed version of the C source code of a computer program implementing the DeCSS decryption algorithm, which can be used by a computer to circumvent a DVD's copy protection.

Protests against the indictment of DeCSS author Jon Lech Johansen and legislation prohibiting publication of DeCSS code took many forms. One of them was the representation of the illegal code in a form that had an intrinsically archivable quality. Since the bits making up a computer program also represent a number, the plan was for the number to have some special property that would make it archivable and publishable (one method was to print it on a T-shirt). The primality of a number is a fundamental property of number theory and is therefore not dependent on legal definitions of any particular jurisdiction.

=== Admissible databases ===
The large prime database of the PrimePages website records the top 5,000 primes of any form. It also records the top 20 primes of various special forms; one of them is proof of primality using the elliptic curve primality proving (ECPP) algorithm. Thus, if the number were large enough and proved prime using ECPP, it would be published. (Technically, prime numbers are proven using ECPP usually because they are not of a special form that allows proof using a simpler method. PrimePages includes a note that "this Top 20 category doesn't fit with the rest and has a strong possibility of being removed in the future.")

The probable prime number database of Henri Lifchitz & Renaud Lifchitz records the top 10,000 probable primes of any form.

=== Methods of construction ===
Gzip was used in Carmody's original entry because it is null-terminated. In other words, for gzipped data k, the byte sequence k || 0x00 || b for any byte sequence b produces the same decompressed result. In numerical terms, it means any k × 256^{n} + b (b < 256^{n - 1}) would produce the same decompression. This echoes the Dirichlet's theorem on arithmetic progressions, where it is proven that for coprime integers b and k, there are infinitely many primes ak + b, a being a natural number.

Hannum later found a way to construct an illegal prime without compression. He started with a short C source file of the DeCSS algorithm and changed variable names to make the binary representation a prime number.

Carmody subsequently produced in October 2001 a prime number that, when written in its binary form, works as an x86 Linux program for deCSS. This is an illegal, executable prime.

The above discusses ways to generate computer files which work functionally the same while altering bits in a way that may change their primality. Primes are found among candidate altered numbers first using a probable prime test, then probable primes are certified using the ECPP method.

== Other examples ==
There are other examples in which possession of encryption keys or other copyright circumvention devices have come under legal threat.

- In 2009, the Texas Instruments signing key controversy ensued. The 512-bit RSA signing keys for TI calculator firmware were factored. Texas Instruments responded with DMCA threats.
- In 2010, the HDCP master key was released. Intel has threatened legal action against anyone producing hardware to circumvent the HDCP, possibly under the DMCA.
- In 2023, Valve Corporation contacted Nintendo regarding the Dolphin emulator's Steam listing. The reply letter sent to Valve, which resulted in the removal of the title's Steam listing, cites the anti-circumvention language of the DMCA and specifically claims that:
  The Dolphin emulator operates by incorporating these cryptographic keys without Nintendo's authorization and decrypting the ROMs at or immediately before runtime. Thus, use of the Dolphin emulator unlawfully 'circumvent[s] a technological measure that effectively controls access to a work protected under' the Copyright Act.

There are other contexts in which smaller numbers have run afoul of laws or regulations or drawn the attention of authorities.

- In 2012, it was reported that the numbers 89, 6, 4, and 64 became banned search terms on search engines in China. These numbers correspond to the date June 4, 1989, the day of the Tiananmen Square Massacre.
- Also in 2012, the school district in Greeley, Colorado banned the wearing of jerseys that bore the numbers 18, 14, or 13 (or the reverse: 81, 41, or 31) due to affiliations with the 18th Street, Norteños, and Sureños gangs, respectively.
- In 2017, far-right Slovak politician Marian Kotleba was criminally charged for donating €1,488 to a charity. The number is a reference to a white supremacist slogan and the Nazi salute.
- In 2019, Matteo Salvini, then Deputy Prime Minister of Italy, banned the number 49 from his Facebook profile. This was to prevent any association with the corruption scandal about party subsidies in his party, Lega Nord, which amounted to €49,000,000.
- In 2026, former FBI director James Comey was indicted for posting a photo of the number 8647 on his Instagram page. In the United States, 86 is used as a verb meaning to "get rid of", but can also mean that someone is not welcome at an establishment, or that menu items or ingredients at a restaurant are not available. Donald Trump is the 47th president of the United States; the post was interpreted by the Department of Justice as threatening him.

== See also ==
- Normal number
- Infinite monkey theorem
- The Library of Babel
- Prior art
- Streisand effect
- Numerology
