= Ticketmaster, LLC v. RMG Technologies, Inc. =

- Court: United States District Court for the Central District of California
- Full case name: Ticketmaster, LLC v. RMG Technologies, Inc. and Does 1 through 10
- Decided: October 15, 2007
- Docket nos.: 2:07-cv-02534
- Citation: 507 F. Supp. 2d 1096

Case history
- Subsequent actions: Motion to dismiss granted, 536 F. Supp. 2d 1191 (C.D. Cal. 2008).

Court membership
- Judge sitting: Audrey B. Collins

Ticketmaster LLC v. RMG Technologies, Inc., 507 F. Supp. 2d 1096 (C.D. Cal. 2007), was an infringement case heard by Judge Audrey B. Collins of the United States District Court for the Central District of California.

In this particular case, the Court held that Ticketmaster LLC ("Ticketmaster") was likely to prevail on claims of direct and contributory copyright infringement as a result of defendant RMG Technologies Inc. ("RMG") distribution of a software application that permitted its clients to circumvent Ticketmaster.com’s CAPTCHA access controls, and use Ticketmaster’s copyrighted website in a manner that violated the site’s Terms of Use. The Court held that RMG was likely to be found guilty of direct copyright infringement because when RMG viewed the site to create and test its product, it made unauthorized copies of Ticketmaster’s site in its computer’s RAM.
