= GPU switching =

Mechanism for computers with multiple graphic controllers

A classic motherboard with on-board integrated graphics processors, a discrete graphics card can be installed at a PCI slot

GPU switching is a mechanism used on computers with multiple graphic controllers. This mechanism allows the user to either maximize the graphic performance or prolong battery life by switching between the graphic cards. It is mostly used on gaming laptops which usually have an integrated graphic device and a discrete video card.

== Basic components ==
Most computers using this feature contain integrated graphics processors and dedicated graphics cards that applies to the following categories.

=== Integrated graphics ===
Also known as: Integrated graphics, shared graphics solutions, integrated graphics processors (IGP) or unified memory architecture (UMA). This kind of graphics processors usually have much fewer processing units and share the same memory with the CPU.

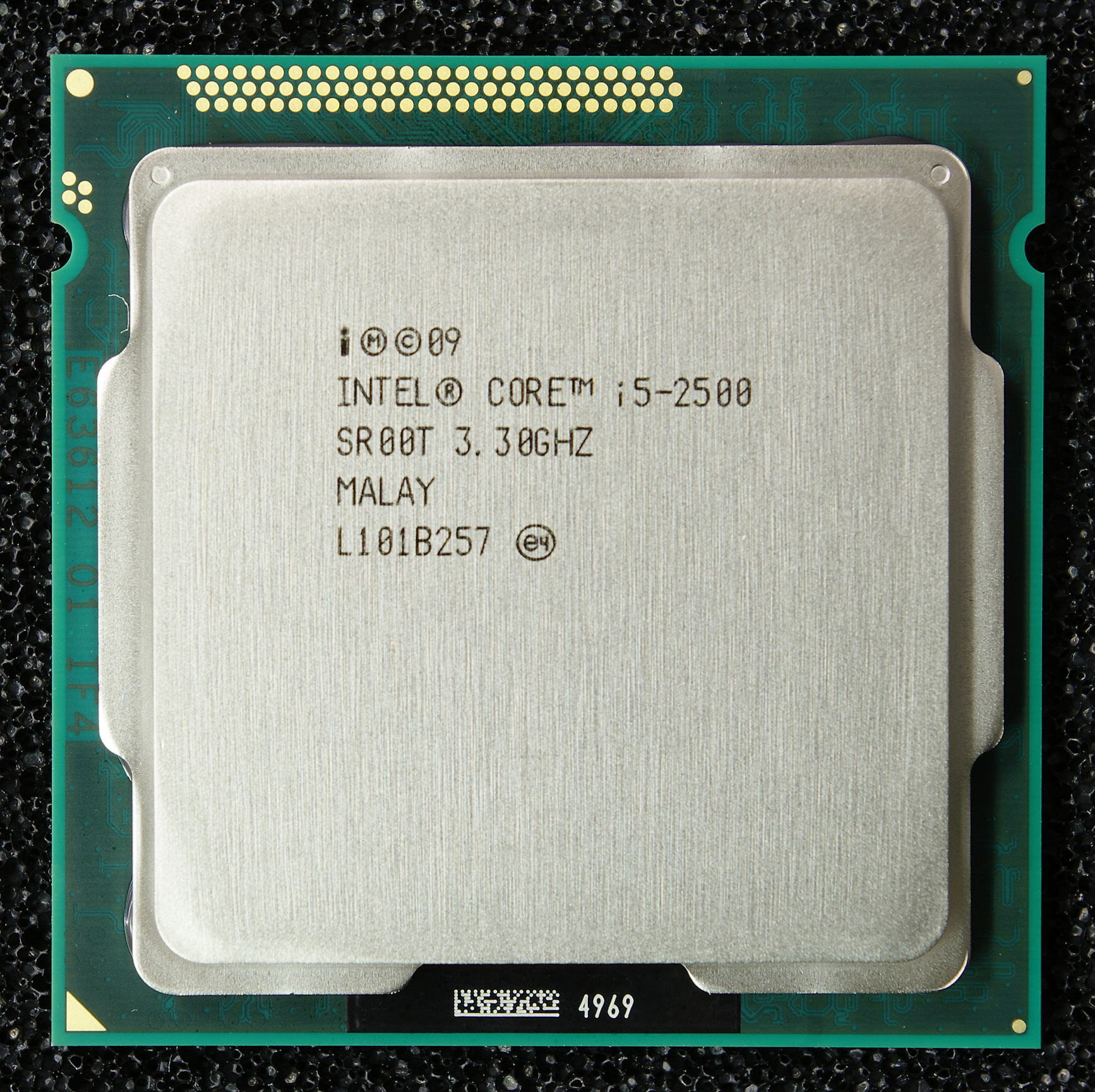
Intel Core i5 processor with integrated HD Graphics 2000

Sometimes the graphics processors are integrated onto a motherboard. It is commonly known as: on-board graphics. A motherboard with on-board graphics processors doesn't require a discrete graphics card or a CPU with graphics processors to operate.

=== Dedicated graphics cards ===
Also known as: discrete graphics cards. Unlike integrated graphics, dedicated graphics cards have much more processing units and have its own RAM with much higher memory bandwidth.

In some cases, a dedicated graphics chip can be integrated onto the motherboards, B150-GP104 for example. Regardless of the fact that the graphics chip is integrated, it is still counted as a dedicated graphics cards system because the graphics chip is integrated with its own memory.

== Theory ==
Figure 1. Motherboard diagram outlining a structure of modern PC computer architecture (typically x86-64-based). Southbridge, Northbridge and busses are visible.

Most Personal Computers have a motherboard that uses a Southbridge and Northbridge structure.

=== Northbridge control ===
The Northbridge is one of the core logic chipset that handles communications between the CPU, GPU, RAM and the Southbridge. The discrete graphics card is usually installed onto the graphics card slot such as PCI-Express and the integrated graphics is integrated onto the CPU itself or occasionally onto the Northbridge. The Northbridge is the most responsible for switching between GPUs. The way how it works usually has the following process (refer to the Figure 1. on the right):

1. The Northbridge receives input from Southbridge through the internal bus.
2. The Northbridge signals to CPU through the Front-side bus.
3. The CPU runs the task assignment application (usually the graphics card driver) to determine which GPU core to use.
4. The CPU passes down the command to the Northbridge.
5. The Northbridge passes down the command to the according GPU core.
6. The GPU core processes the command and returns the rendered data back to the Northbridge.
7. The Northbridge sends the rendered data back to Southbridge.

=== Southbridge control ===
The Southbridge is a set of integrated circuits such Intel's I/O Controller Hub (ICH). It handles all of a computer's I/O functions, such as receiving the keyboard input and outputting the data onto the screen. The way how it usually works usually has two steps:

1. Take in the user input and pass it down to the Northbridge.
2. (Optional) Receive the rendered data from the Northbridge and output it.

The reason why the second step can be optional is that sometimes the rendered the data is outputted directly from the discrete graphics card which is located on the graphics card slot so there is no need to output the data through the Southbridge.

== Main purpose ==
GPU switching is mostly used for saving energy by switching between graphic cards. The dedicated graphics cards consume much more power than integrated graphics but also provides higher 3D performances, which is needed for a better gaming and CAD experience. Following is a list of the TDPs of the most popular CPU with integrated graphics and dedicated graphics cards.

TDP of Integrated Graphics and Dedicated Graphics Cards
Model							Platform
Integrated Graphics			Dedicated Graphics Cards				Platform
Intel		TDP	Nvidia	TDP	AMD	TDP	Platform
CPU Model & Frequency	Intel IGP Serie	TDP	Nvidia	TDP	AMD	TDP	Platform
Intel Core i7-6700K @ 4.00 GHz	Intel HD Graphics 530	91W	GTX 1080	180W	Radeon R9 Fury	275W	Desktop
Intel Core i5-6600K @ 3.50 GHz	Intel HD Graphics 530	91W	GTX 970	145W	Radeon R9 Nano	175W	Desktop
Intel Core i7-4790K @ 4.40 GHz	Intel HD Graphics 4600	88W	GTX 780Ti	250W	Radeon RX 480	150W	Desktop
Intel Core i7-6700HQ @ 2.60 GHz	Intel HD Graphics 530	45W	GTX 1080	165W	Radeon R9 M485X	125W	Laptop
Intel Core i7-6500U @ 2.50 GHz	Intel HD Graphics 520	15W	GTX 980M	100W	Radeon R9 M470X	75W	Laptop
Intel Core i5-6200U @ 2.30 GHz	Intel HD Graphics 520	15W	GTX 880M	103W	Radeon R9 M470	75W	Laptop
Intel Core i5-5200U @ 2.20 GHz	Intel HD Graphics 5500	15W	GTX 870M	103W	Radeon HD 7950M	50W	Laptop

The dedicated graphics cards exhibit much higher power consumption than the integrated graphics on both platforms. Disabling them when no heavy graphics processing is needed can significantly lower the power consumption.

== Technologies ==
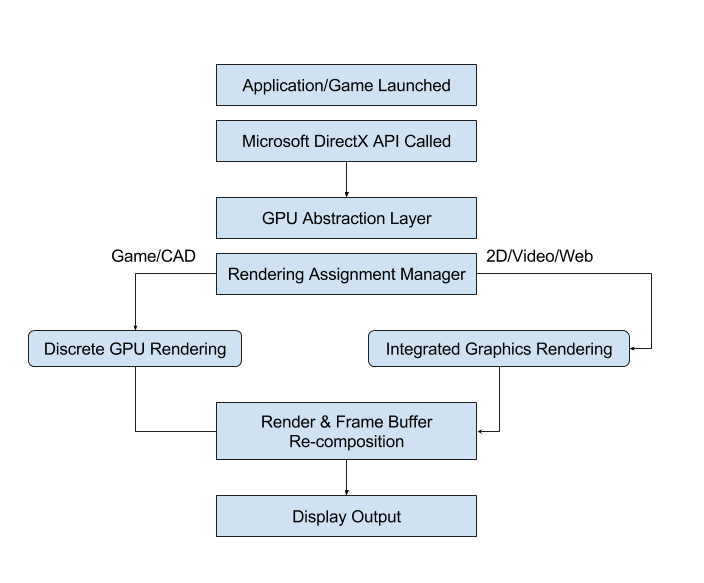
A classic graphic rendering process with multiple GPU cores

=== Nvidia Optimus ===
Nvidia Optimus™ is a computer GPU switching technology created by Nvidia that can dynamically and seamlessly switch between two graphic cards based on running programs.

=== AMD Enduro ===
AMD Enduro™ is a collective brand developed by AMD that features many new technologies that can significantly save power. It was previously named as: PowerXpress and Dynamic Switchable Graphics (DSG). This technology implements a sophisticated system to predict the potential usage need for graphics cards and switch between graphics cards based on predicted need. This technology also introduces a new power control plan that allows the discrete graphics cards consume no energy when idling.

== Manufacturers ==
=== Integrated graphics ===
In personal computers, the IGP (integrated graphics processors) are mostly manufactured by Intel and AMD and are integrated onto their CPUs. They are commonly known as:

- Intel HD and Iris Graphics - also called HD series and Iris series
- AMD Accelerated Processing Unit (APU) - also formerly known as: fusion

=== Dedicated graphics cards ===
The most popular dedicated graphics cards are manufactured by AMD and Nvidia. They are commonly known as:

- AMD Radeon
- Nvidia GeForce

== Drivers and OS support ==
Most common operating systems have built-in support for this feature. However, the users may download the updated drivers from Nvidia or AMD for better experience.

=== Windows support ===
Windows 7 has built-in support for this feature. The system automatically switches between GPUs depending on the program that's running. However, the user may switch the GPUs manually through device manager or power manager.

=== Linux support ===
In the Linux systems, a patch named vga_switcheroo has been added to the Linux kernel since version 2.6.34 in order to deal with multiple GPUs. Here, the switch requires a restart of the X Window System to be taken into account.

Ubuntu Control Center allows the user to access vga_switcheroo functionality through a GUI.

=== Mac OS support ===
Mac OS has built-in support for this feature since v10.5 Leopard. Since OS X Mountain Lion, Apple has integrated the GPU monitor into the Activity Monitor.

== Existing troubles ==
- System incompatibility or unstable power supply may cause Blue Screen of Death or other bugs
- Unable to switch if the system wrongly estimated the required computing resource
- Switching may cause unstable voltage which can lead to flashy screen
- Inconsistent drivers across vendors for smooth switching

== See also ==
- Graphics processing unit (GPU)
- Nvidia Optimus
- ATI Hybrid Graphics
