= Kernel.org =

Main distribution point of Linux source code

kernel.org
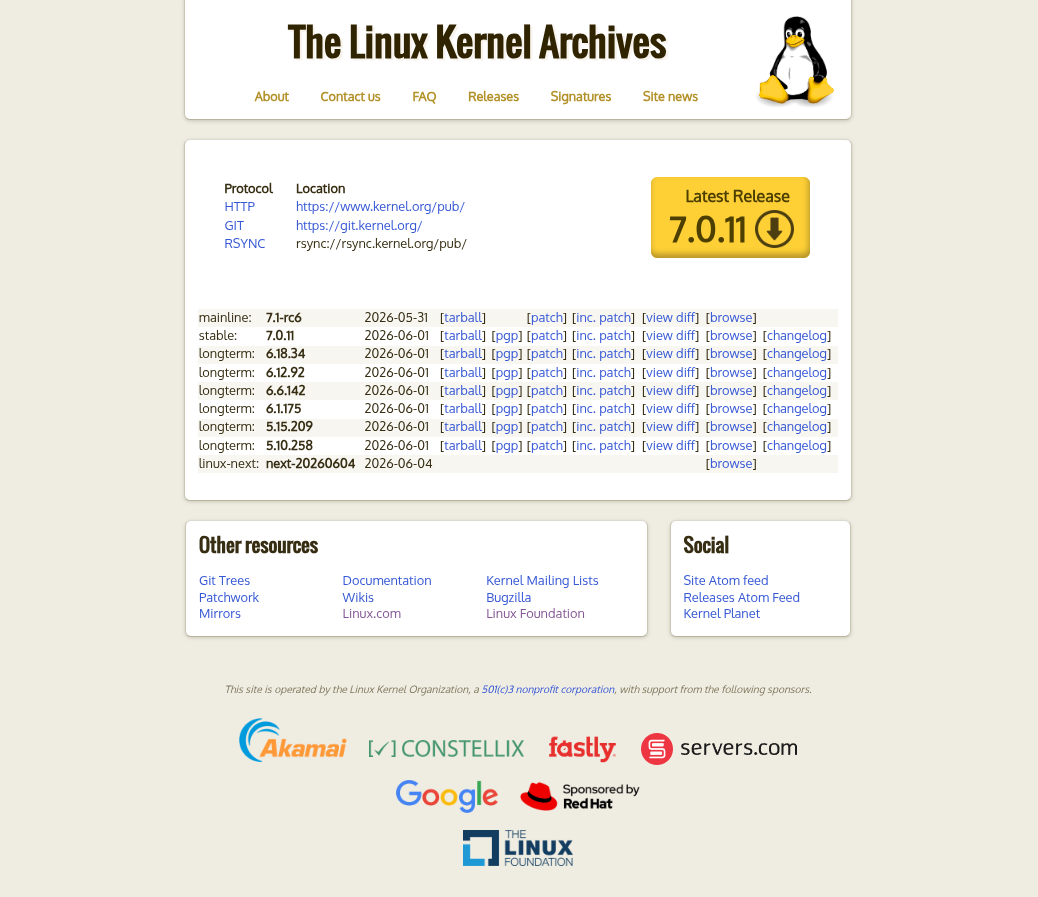
- Screenshot of the Kernel.org website on 4 June 2026.
- Website type: Open source repository
- Available in: English
- Website: kernel.org
- IPv6 support: Yes
- Commercial: No
- Current status: Active

kernel.org on the World Wide Web is the main distribution point of source code for the Linux kernel, which is the base of the Linux operating system.

The website and related infrastructure, which is operated by the Linux Kernel Organization, host the repositories that make all versions of the kernel's source code available to all users. The main purpose of kernel.org is to host repositories used by Linux kernel developers and maintainers of various Linux distributions. Additionally, it hosts various other projects or their mirrors, including the Linux Documentation Project (LDP) and CPAN.

Since August 2014, kernel.org provides additional security by mandating two-factor authentication for commits performed to hosted Git repositories that contain source code of the Linux kernel, with support for both soft tokens and hard tokens.

== 2011 security breach ==
On 28 August 2011, developers at kernel.org realized that there had been a major security breach. Intruders had gained root access to the system and added a trojan to the startup scripts. Developers reinstalled all the servers and investigated the origin of the attack. It is likely, although not confirmed, that the kernel.org intrusion is related to the intrusions of LinuxFoundation.org and Linux.com websites that were determined shortly afterwards.

Git, a distributed and open-source source management system designed by Linus Torvalds to guarantee the integrity of the source code, is used to keep track of changes in the Linux source code. This and the fact that the source code is available to anyone and widely known makes any attempt to tamper with the source code fairly easy to detect and revert if required. All that makes kernel.org not the primary repository, but rather a distribution point of the kernel sources.

Kernel.org was back online by November 2011, with the exception of a few secondary services. A 27 year old resident of Florida, US was arrested in 2016 for the attack.

== See also ==
- Linux kernel mailing list (LKML)
