= George Hotz =

American software engineer

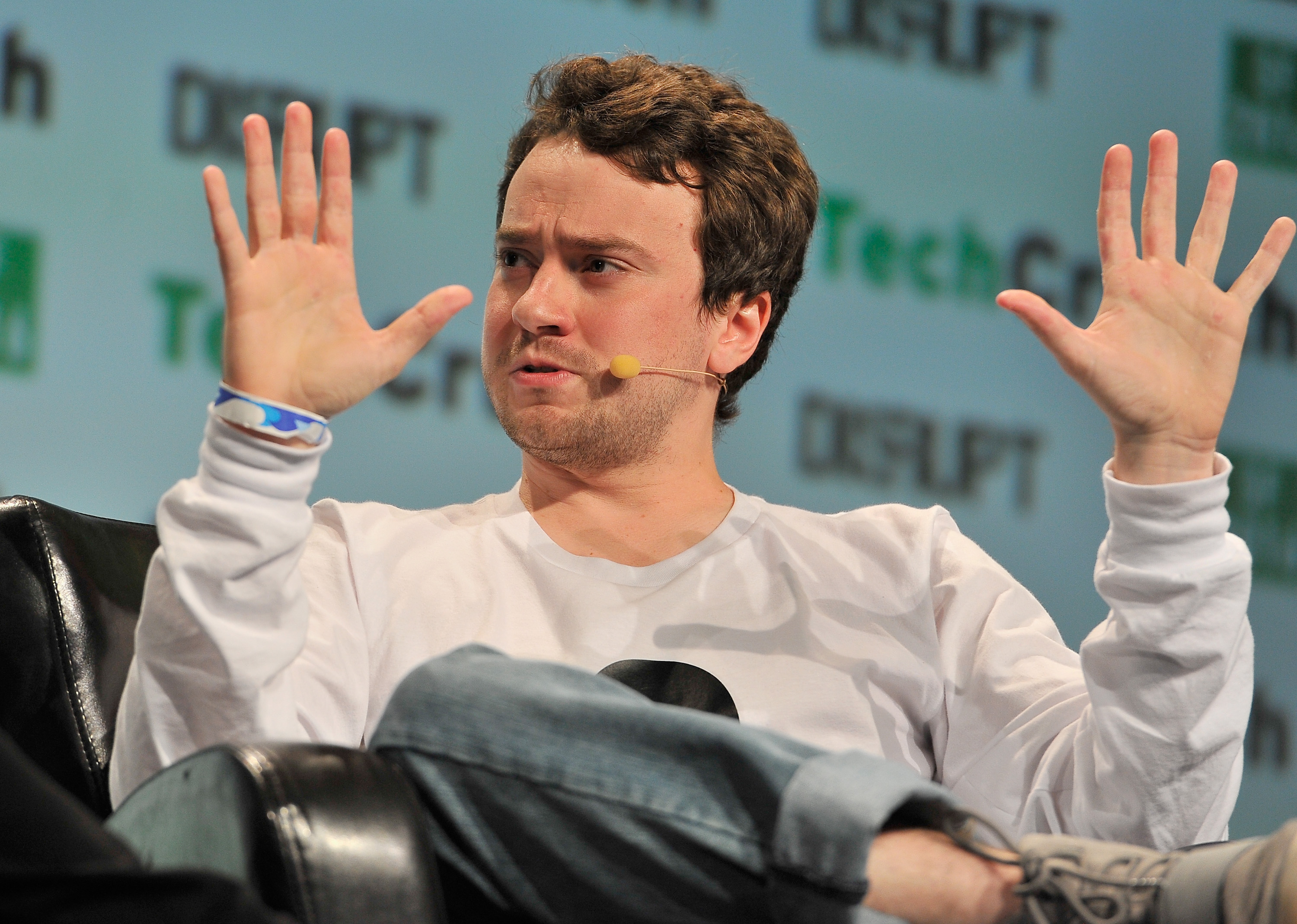
- Hotz in 2016
- Born: George Francis Hotz; October 2, 1989 (age 37); Glen Rock, New Jersey, U.S.
- Other names: geohot, tomcr00se
- Years active: 2007–present
- Known for: • Jailbreaking; • Comma.ai and openpilot; • Tinygrad
- Website: Official website

George Francis Hotz (born October 2, 1989), known online by geohot, is an American security hacker, entrepreneur, and software engineer. He is known for developing iOS jailbreaks, reverse engineering the PlayStation 3, and for the subsequent lawsuit brought against him by Sony. From September 2015 until November 2025, he worked on his vehicle automation machine learning company comma.ai. Since November 2022, Hotz has been working on tinygrad, a deep learning framework.

== Education ==
Hotz attended the Academy for Engineering and Design Technology at the Bergen County Academies, a magnet public high school in Hackensack, New Jersey. Hotz is an alumnus of the Johns Hopkins Center for Talented Youth program. Hotz also briefly attended Rochester Institute of Technology and Carnegie Mellon University.

== Security research ==
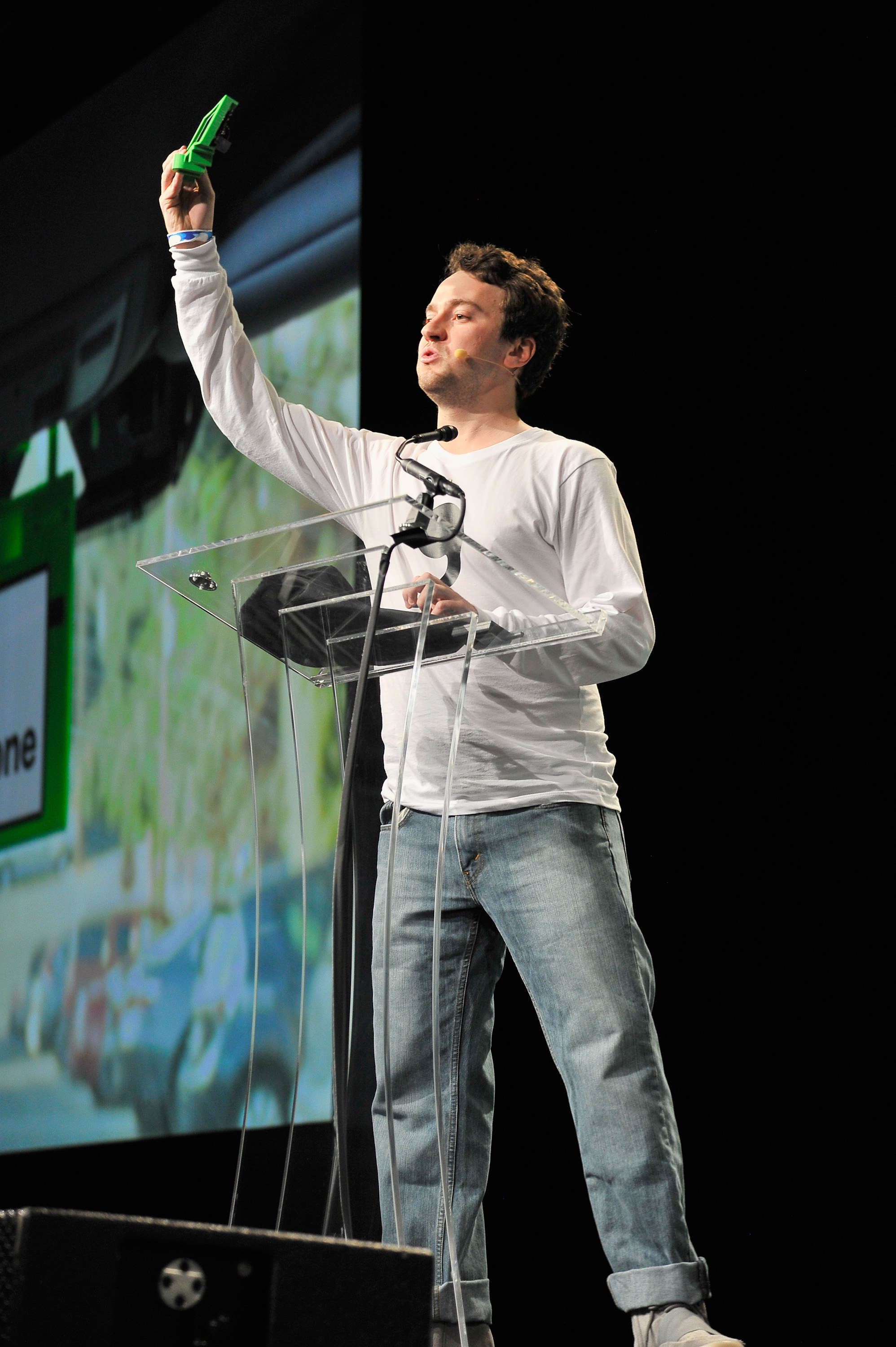
George Hotz speaking onstage during TechCrunch Disrupt SF 2016

=== iOS ===
In August 2007, seventeen-year-old George Hotz became the first person reported to remove the SIM lock on an iPhone. He traded his second unlocked 8 GB iPhone to Terry Daidone, the founder of CertiCell, for a Nissan 350Z and three 8 GB iPhones.

In October 2009, Hotz released blackra1n. It was compatible with all iPhone and iPod Touch devices running iOS 3.1.2.

On July 13, 2010, Hotz announced the discontinuation of his jailbreaking activities, citing demotivation over the technology and the unwanted personal attention. Nevertheless, he continued to release new software-based jailbreak techniques until October 2010.

One of his last works, limera1n, was publicly disclosed in October 2010.

=== PlayStation 3 ===
In December 2009, Hotz announced his initial intentions to breach security on the PlayStation 3. On January 22, 2010, he announced that he had gained read and write access to the machine's system memory as well as hypervisor level access to the machine's CPU.

On January 26, 2010, Hotz released the exploit to the public. On March 28, 2010, Sony responded by announcing their intention to release a PlayStation 3 firmware update that would remove the OtherOS feature from all models, a feature that was already absent on the newer Slim revisions of the machine.

On July 13, 2010, Hotz posted a message on his Twitter account stating that he had abandoned his efforts.

==== Sony lawsuit ====
On December 29, 2010, hacking group fail0verflow did a presentation at the 27th Chaos Communications Congress where they exposed a mistake of Sony in their usage of ECDSA signatures without publishing the corresponding private key. This key was used by Sony to prevent piracy. On January 2, 2011, Hotz posted a copy of the private key of the PlayStation 3 on his website. These keys were later removed from his website as a result of legal action by Sony against fail0verflow and Hotz. In response to his continued publication of PS3 exploit information, Sony filed on January 11, 2011, for an application for a temporary restraining order (TRO) against him in the US District Court of Northern California.

Hotz published his commentary on the case, including a song about the "disaster" of Sony. Sony in turn has demanded that social media sites, including YouTube, hand over IP addresses of people who visited Geohot's social pages and videos, the latter being the case only for those who "watched the video and 'documents reproducing all records or usernames and IP addresses that have posted or published comments in response to the video".

PayPal granted Sony access to Geohot's PayPal account contribution transactions, and the judge of the case granted Sony permission to view the IP addresses of everyone who visited geohot.com. In April 2011, it was revealed that Sony and Hotz had settled the lawsuit out of court, on the condition that Hotz would never again resume any hacking work on Sony products.

=== Android ===
In June 2014, Hotz published a root exploit software hack for Samsung Galaxy S5 devices used in the US market. The exploit is built around the CVE-2014-3153 vulnerability, which was discovered by hacker Pinkie Pie, and it involves an issue in the futex subsystem that in turn allows for privilege escalation. The exploit, known as towelroot, was designated as a "one-click Android rooting tool".

Although originally released for the Verizon Galaxy S5, the root exploit was made compatible with most Android devices available at that time. For example, it was tested and found to work with the AT&T Galaxy S5, Nexus 5, and Galaxy S4 Active. Updates continued to be applied to the root exploit to increase its capabilities with other devices running Android. Updates to the Android operating system closed the source of the exploit. Samsung officially responded to the towelroot exploit by releasing updated software designed to be immune from the exploit.

== Career ==
Hotz made a meaningful side income from public donations solicited for his security exploits.

Hotz worked at Facebook between May 2011 and January 2012.

On July 16, 2014, Google hired Hotz to work with the Project Zero team where he developed Qira for dynamically analysing application binaries.

Hotz was employed at the startup Vicarious from January until July 2015.

In 2022, shortly after the acquisition of Twitter by Elon Musk, Hotz announced that he had joined the company for a 12-week internship, with the task of fixing Twitter search as well as removing the pop up log-in screen displayed to users scrolling without being logged in to an account. On December 20, after less than 5 weeks at the role, he resigned, stating “appreciate the opportunity, but didn’t think there was any real impact I could make there”.

=== comma.ai ===
Hotz founded comma.ai in September 2015 to develop advanced driver-assistance systems using machine learning. He demonstrated an early prototype, a self-driving Acura ILX, on California's Interstate 280, which resulted in a cease-and-desist letter from the California Department of Motor Vehicles.

The company initially planned to sell an aftermarket device called the "comma one," but canceled it in October 2016 after the National Highway Traffic Safety Administration requested information about its compliance with Federal Motor Vehicle Safety Standards. A month later, comma.ai released its driving software, openpilot, as open-source software.

The company subsequently developed hardware devices to run openpilot, including the comma two (2020) and comma three (2021). In November 2020, Consumer Reports ranked openpilot above all other advanced driver-assistance systems, including Tesla Autopilot, Cadillac Super Cruise, and Ford Co-Pilot 360, particularly for driver engagement and ease of use. As of 2025, openpilot supports over 300 vehicle models, with users having accumulated over 100 million miles driven.

Hotz stepped down from day-to-day leadership of comma.ai in October 2022, citing that the company had matured beyond the stage where his skills were best suited, though he remained on the board.

=== tiny corp ===
Hotz founded tiny corp on November 5, 2022. tiny corp aims to port machine learning instruction sets to hardware accelerators.

On May 24, 2023, tiny corp announced that they raised $5.1M to build computers for machine learning and develop a neural network framework called tinygrad. tinygrad, the neural network framework developed by tiny corp, aims to provide a balance between the simplicity of Andrej Karpathy's micrograd framework and the functionality of the PyTorch framework. tinygrad aims to realize performance gains over PyTorch through a number of optimizations, including dynamic compilation, fusing of operations, and a greatly simplified backend. tinygrad is currently used to enable comma.ai's openpilot framework to run on the company's dedicated hardware, which includes a Snapdragon 845 GPU.

Additionally, tiny corp builds the tinybox, a $15,000 AI computer aimed at local model training and inference, serving as a personal compute cluster.

== Other activities and recognition ==
Hotz was a finalist at the 2004 Intel International Science and Engineering Fair (ISEF), a science competition for high school students, in Portland, Oregon with his project "The Mapping Robot". Recognition included interviews on the Today Show and Larry King Show. Hotz was a finalist at the 2005 ISEF competition, with his project "The Googler".

Hotz competed at the 2007 ISEF where his 3D imaging project, entitled "I want a Holodeck", received awards and prizes in several categories including a $20,000 Intel scholarship. He travelled to Sweden to speak about the project at the Stockholm International Youth Science Seminar.

In March 2008, PC World listed Hotz as one of the top 10 Overachievers under 21.

In August 2013, Hotz attended the DEF CON hacker convention with Carnegie Mellon's Plaid Parliament of Pwning (PPP). PPP placed first in the DEF CON Capture the Flag (CTF) tournament. Later in 2013, Hotz also competed in the 2013 New York University Tandon School of Engineering Cyber Security Awareness Week (CSAW). Working alone, Hotz took first place under the pseudonym tomcr00se. In August 2014, Hotz once again competed as part of Carnegie Mellon's PPP to win the DEF CON CTF tournament for a second year in a row. The team also won the DEF CON "Crack Me If You Can" tournament.

In 2013, Hotz began making hip hop music on his SoundCloud, tomcr00se. As of April 2025, he has made 28 original songs and covers.

Hotz also has a Twitch channel, where he frequently does programming livestreams. As of April 2025, his twitch channel has over 83k followers.

In February 2020, Hotz founded the cheapETH crypto currency.
