= List of display servers =

This is a list of display servers based on X11, Wayland, Linux framebuffer and other systems.

== X11 ==
- Cygwin/X
- KDrive
- Low Bandwidth X
- MacX
- Ming64x
- Mir (display server)
- MKS X/Server
- Multi-Pointer X
- Reflection X
- RISCwindows
- WiredX
- X.Org Server
- X-Win32
- X386
- Xapollo
- XDarwin
- Xephyr
- XFree86
- Xming
- Xmove
- Xnest
- Xnews (X11 server)
- Xpra
- XQuartz
- Xsgi
- Xsun
- Xvfb
- XWinLogon
- Xlibre

== Wayland ==
| Name | Type | Language | Initial release | Latest release | | License | Libraries | | Active | Operating systems | | | Shell type | Remarks |
| Name | Type | Language | Initial release | Version | Date | License | Protocol | Other | Active | Linux | BSDs | Other | Shell type | Remarks |
|---|---|---|---|---|---|---|---|---|---|---|---|---|---|---|
| COSMIC | Dynamic | Rust | 2024 | Epoch 1.0.12 | 2026-05-05 | GPL-3.0-only | Smithay | Iced | Yes | Yes | No | No | Separate | Designed for Pop!_OS |
| dwl | Dynamic (dwm-like) | C | 2020 | 0.7 | 2024-11-15 | GPL-3.0-only | wlroots | libinput | Yes | Yes | Yes | No | Separate | dwm-like tiling |
| Enlightenment | Compositing | C | 2012 | 0.26.0 | 2023-12-23 | BSD-2-Clause | libwayland-server | EFL | Yes | Yes | Yes | POSIX | Built-in | Default for the Enlightenment desktop environment |
| Hikari | Floating | C | — | — | 2022 | MIT | wlroots | libinput | Until 2022 | Yes | Yes | POSIX | Separate | Targets primarily FreeBSD; inspired by CalmWM |
| Hyprland | Dynamic/Tiling | C++ | 2022 | 0.55 | 2026-05-09 | BSD-3-Clause | aquamarine | libinput | Yes | Yes | Yes | POSIX | Separate | Smooth animations, rounded corners and blur |
| KWin (KDE) | Compositing/Stacking | C++ (Qt) | 2011 | 6.2.5 | 2024-12-31 | GPL-2.0-or-later | Qt Wayland | Qt | Yes | Yes | Yes | POSIX | Built-in | Default for KDE |
| Labwc | Stacking | C | 2021 | 0.8.2 | 2024-11-20 | GPL-2.0-only | wlroots | libinput | Yes | Yes | Yes | ? | Separate | Inspired by Openbox, used by Raspberry Pi OS |
| Lipstick | Mobile UI manager | C++ | — | — | — | LGPL-2.1 | libwayland-server | Qt 5 | Yes | Yes | No | No | Built-in | Based on QML, intended for Sailfish OS |
| Mazecompositor | Toy / Demo | C++ | — | — | — | MIT | libwayland-server | Qt 5 | No | Yes | No | No | No shell | Compositor presented as a 3D game-like maze |
| Mir | Kiosk/embedded | C++ | — | — | — | GPL | libwayland-server | Qt 5, GTK | Yes | Yes | No | No | Plugin | Canonical's embedded-targeting compositor |
| Muffin | Floating | C | — | — | — | GPL | libwayland-server | libinput | Yes | Yes | Yes | POSIX | Built-in | Default for Cinnamon |
| Mutter (GNOME) | Compositing/Stacking | C | 2013 | 47.3 | 2025-01-08 | GPL-2.0-or-later | libwayland | libinput | Yes | Yes | Yes | POSIX | Built-in | Default for GNOME |
| niri | Scrolling/Tiling | Rust | 2023 | 25.11 | 2025-11-29 | GPL-3.0-or-later | Smithay | — | Yes | Yes | Yes | ? | Separate | Scrollable, tiling compositor |
| orbment | Tiling | C | — | — | — | GPL-3+ | libwayland-server | wlc, libinput | No | Yes | No | No | No shell | No code contribution since 2016 |
| River | Dynamic | Zig | 2020 | 0.3.5 | 2024-10-18 | GPL-3.0-only | wlroots | libinput | Yes | Yes | Yes | POSIX | Separate | Generic compositor; uses separate WM |
| Sway | Tiling (i3-like) | C | 2015-09-23 | 1.11 | 2025-06-08 | MIT | wlroots | libinput | Yes | Yes | Yes | POSIX | Separate | i3 replication |
| Way Cooler | Tiling | Rust | — | — | — | MIT | libwayland-server | wlc, libinput | No | Yes | Yes | POSIX | Separate | Designed to replace AwesomeWM; unmaintained |
| Wayfire | Compositing | C++ | 2018 | 0.10.0 | 2025-08-27 | MIT | wlroots | libinput | Yes | Yes | Yes | POSIX | Separate | 3D compositor; Compiz-inspired |
| Waylandcraft | Toy / Demo | Java / Rust | 2026 | 2.1.0 | 2026-09-25 | GPL-3.0-only | Smithay | — | Yes | Yes | Yes | ? | No shell | Compositor implemented as a Minecraft mod |
| Weston | Stacking | C | 2012 | 14.0.0 | 2024-09-04 | MIT | libweston | libwayland, libinput | Yes | Yes | Yes | POSIX | Built-in | Reference Implementation |

== Linux framebuffer ==
- DirectFB
- DirectFB2
- DirectFBGL

== Other ==
- Quartz Compositor
- SPICE
- SurfaceFlinger

== See also ==
- X Window System
- Display server
- Windowing system
