= MKS X/Server =

MKS X/Server, a commercial X server developed by MKS Inc., allows users to access Unix/Linux systems from a PC computers which run a Microsoft Windows operating system. The product offers both a full 32-bit X server and a native 64-bit X server (for x64 based systems) that operate on various versions of Microsoft Windows.

== History ==
Since 1995 MKS has distributed the SCO/Tarantella XVision Eclipse PC X server product to its customer base as part of its MKS Toolkit product line. In 2006 MKS acquired the source code rights XVision giving the company the ability to maintain and enhance the product as needed by the market and its customers.

MKS X/Server is available as a standalone product, bundled with various versions of the MKS Toolkit product and available as a runtime option to UNIX/Linux applications ported to Windows using the MKS Toolkit for Enterprise Developers application.

== Functional overview ==
- Flexible desktop shortcuts to start UNIX programs remotely (with direct import settings of previously installed X servers)
- Secure Shell (SSH) is built into terminal emulators, Unix Neighborhood and Remote Program Starter
- Cut and paste between UNIX and Windows applications
- Zones Desktop manager
- X keyboard mapper
- Multi-monitor support
- OpenGL/GLX extension
- English and Japanese support
- Hummingbird Exceed compatibility

=== Supported standards ===
- Full X11 compliance
- Native Windows X servers (32 bit and 64 bit)
- Latest internet standards like IPv6 and Secure Shell
- AF_UNIX support with the MKS NuTCRACKER platform and tunneled SSH connections

=== System OS requirements ===
- Windows Vista, Windows Vista 64 bit
- Windows 2003 Server, Windows 2003 Server x64 Edition
- Windows XP, Windows XP x64 Edition
- Windows 2000

== See also ==
- X-Win32 - A commercial alternative
- Exceed - A commercial alternative
- Xming
