= Kmscon =

Userspace virtual console for Linux operating system

kmscon
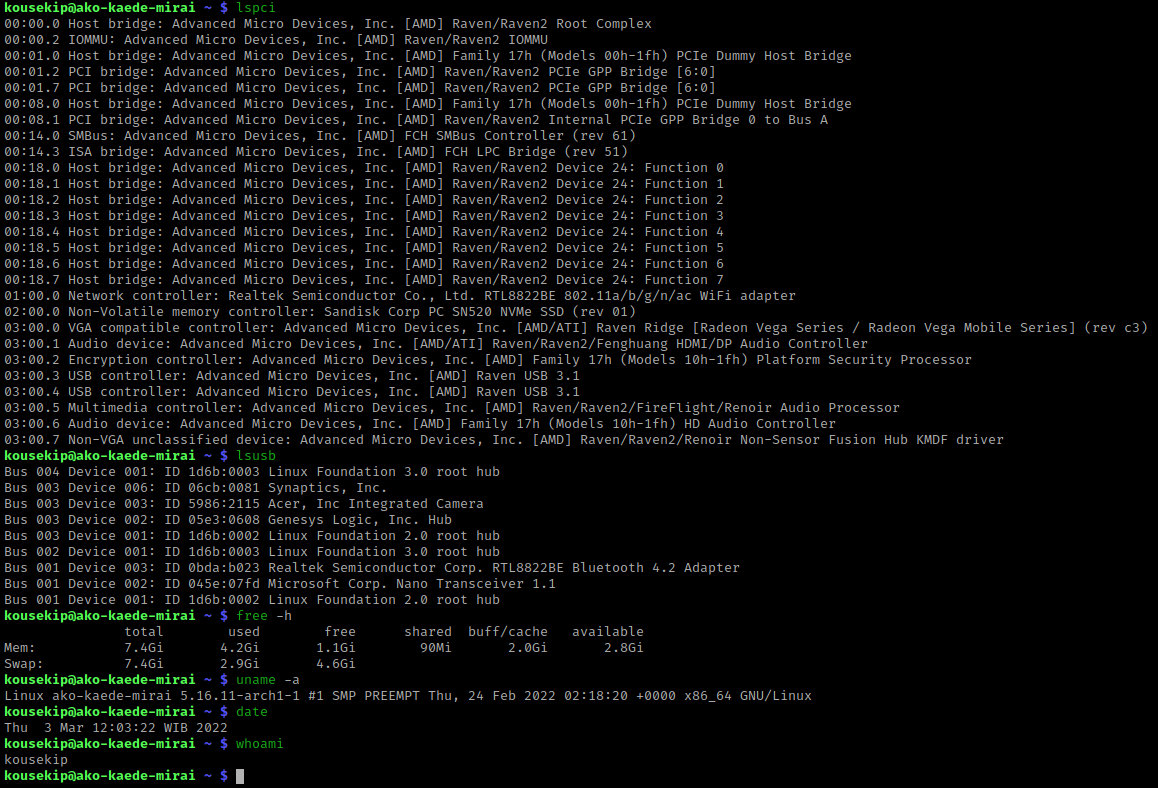
- Developer: David Herrmann
- Release: 27 March 2012; 14 years ago
- Stable release: 10.0.0 / 21 May 2026; 4 months ago
- Written in: C
- Operating system: Linux
- Type: System console
- License: ISC license
- Website: www.freedesktop.org/wiki/Software/kmscon
- Repository: github.com/kmscon/kmscon

Kmscon is a virtual console that runs in userspace which David Hermann created to replace the Linux console, a terminal built into the Linux kernel. Kmscon uses the KMS driver for its output, it is multiseat-capable, and supports internationalized keyboard input and UTF-8 terminal output. The input support is implemented using X keyboard extension (XKB). Development of Kmscon was halted in March 2015. The project officially resumed in 2025, adopting the codebase from a fork maintained by Aetf since 2011. There was a successor project called systemd-consoled, but that project was later dropped in July 2015.

== Features ==
Kmscon supports printing the full set of Unicode glyphs and is not limited by console encoding as the Linux console. While the only hard dependency is udev, kmscon can optionally be compiled to use Mesa for hardware acceleration of the console, and the pango library for improved font rendering.

The adoption of XKB for input allows kmscon to accept the full range of available keyboard layouts for the X.Org Server and Wayland compositors for input and makes it possible to use the same layout both in graphical environment and in terminal.

It has mouse support including select/copy/paste and scrolling.

=== Multiseat support ===
The VT system in the Linux kernel dates to 1993, and does not implement out-of-the-box multiseat support. It supports up to 63 VTs, but only one VT can be active at any given time. This necessitates additional steps to configure multiseat support. kmscon will enable multiseat out-of-the-box.

If one seat's display server is running on VT 7 and another seat's display server is running on VT 8, then only one of these two seats can be used at a time. To use the other seat, a VT switch must be initiated.

To make all seats usable at the same time, there are a few options:

- Associate all display servers with the same VT: any user can switch VTs and in that case all users switch to the new VT. This makes VT switching (and thus fast user switching) impractical. X.Org Server command-line option -sharevts
- Don't associate any display server with a VT: fast user switching is impossible in this case. Text-based console logins are only possible if an input and display device are reserved for this purpose.
- Associate only one of the display servers with a VT: the other display servers can't do VT switching, but the display server associated with a VT can. VT switching on that one seat won't affect the other seats. This is the approach favored and assumed by systemd. command-line option vt7 for user 1 and -novtswitch for all other users.

== History ==
In 2011, Jesse Barnes wrote in his blog about the possible userspace DRM-based implementation of the virtual terminal, that would dissolve the need for the Linux framebuffer and virtual terminal (VT) subsystems in the Linux kernel. Motivated by this blog post, David Herrmann implemented the basic functionality of virtual terminal.

In October 2013, terminal emulator state machine (libtsm) library, a state machine for DEC VT100–VT520 compatible terminal emulators, was split out of kmscon and made available separately. It was amended with wlterm, an example Wayland terminal emulator.

The program was investigated for implementation during the development of Fedora 44 and subsequently implemented in the beta release of 45, making Fedora the first major Linux distribution to use it by default.

== See also ==
- List of terminal emulators
