= Accelerated-X =

Windowing System

- Developer(s): Xi Graphics
- Stable release: Accelerated-X Summit v2.4
- Operating system: multiple (Linux, Solaris, AIX)
- Type: Windowing system
- License: Proprietary
- Website: www.xig.com

Accelerated-X is a proprietary port of the X Window System to Intel x86 machines.

== History ==
The Accelerated-X server is built on top of the X386 X server that was created by Thomas Roell for X11 Release 5. He founded a company in Colorado named Xi Graphics which still provides the Accelerated-X server. The XFree86 project was created as a free alternative to what became the Accelerated-X server.

== Features ==
Accelerated-X server provides an "overlay mode" on several graphics cards which allows running ancient, 256 color mode-only Unix alongside more modern applications on truecolor 24-bit displays.

It used to provide much better driver support (hardware acceleration, 3D and compatibility, especially on integrated graphics) than XFree86, at a time when the major graphics chipset vendors were not supporting Linux officially.
