= PikaOS =

Linux distribution

- Developer: Cosmo, Ferreo
- OS family: Linux (Unix-like)
- Working state: Current
- Source model: Open source
- Marketing target: Gaming
- Package manager: Synaptic (APT)
- Supported platforms: x86-64
- Kernel type: Monolithic (Linux kernel, custom-patched)
- Userland: GNU
- Default user interface: GNOME (default); KDE Plasma, Hyprland, COSMIC, Niri
- License: Free and open-source software (predominantly GPL and other free-software licenses)
- Official website: pika-os.com

PikaOS is a Linux distribution based on Ubuntu or Debian. It is designed for gaming and easy installation. It does this by showing recommended actions and software during installation and having a dedicated game utility that installs several gaming software together.

== Features ==
PikaOS uses the Calamares installer, enabling features such as USB drive installation. An onboarding app displays during installation to provide options for installing proprietary NVIDIA display drivers, codecs, and libraries, updating software. It then displays recommended software and allows the user to install them, including Krita, Blender, Kdenlive, LibreOffice, and PikaOS Game Utilities. PikaOS Game Utilities is a meta package that installs various gaming-centric tools all at once, including Steam and the Wine compatibility layer.

For the user interface, PikaOS uses a less-customized version of GNOME compared to Ubuntu. The dock resides on the bottom and is hidden by default. Other user interfaces are available, including Hyprland, KDE Plasma, COSMIC, and Niri.

The operating system has Alpine Linux, Arch Linux, and Fedora containers to allow software installation from other distros. Base repository packages are optimized with O3 flags and LTO and compiled for x86-64-v3 architectures, designed for Skylake/Zen CPUs and onwards. The operating system's kernel has performance patches from CachyOS and SCX scheduler algorithms that can be switched via a GUI. PikaOS is very similar to NobaraOS and its codebase is hosted on Gitea.

== Reception ==
PikaOS was praised by ZDNET as an easy to install distro, but they encountered a crash when installing codecs and had to restart the OS. They noted the minimal default pre-installed applications and the extensive customization with six desktop layouts to choose from, and recommended it as a worthwhile distro. Linux Adictos noticed similarities between PikaOS and BlendOS in their available containers and website designs.

== See also ==
- List of Linux distributions
- NobaraOS
