= Text buffer =

Text buffer may refer to:

- In programming:
  - a text buffer is a region in memory where text is temporarily stored while it is being worked on by the CPU. The CPU can write and read to and from a text buffer, essentially manipulating text. The CPU might be moving it from one location to another to fulfil a request by a user. see Data buffer
  - a part of video adapter's memory in a text mode;
  - a backup (or mirror, or emulation) of that part in the system RAM, see e.g. virtual console.
- In text editors:
  - same as clipboard (software), but for text.
