= NXC =

NXC may refer to:

- nxc, NX technology library
- Namco × Capcom, a turn-based strategy console game
- Not eXactly C, a high level language, similar to C, built on top of the Next Byte Codes compiler
- Nuveen California Select Tax-Free Income Portfolio
- National Express Coaches
- National Express Coventry
- netexec, alternatively nxc, a penetration testing tool used to automate the security testing of large networks
- NXC, an abbreviation for Nightcore
