= W Window System =

Discontinued windowing system

- Original authors: Paul Asente, Brian Reid
- Developer: Stanford University
- Operating system: V operating system
- Successor: X Window System
- Type: Windowing system

The W Window System, or simply W, is a discontinued windowing system and precursor, in name and concept, to the X Window System.

W was originally developed at Stanford University by Paul Asente and Brian Reid for the V operating system. In 1983, Paul Asente and Chris Kent ported the system to UNIX on the VS100, giving a copy to those working at MIT's Laboratory for Computer Science.

In 1984, Bob Scheifler of MIT replaced the synchronous protocol of W with an asynchronous alternative and named the result X.

Since this time, the X window system has gone through many fundamental changes and no longer bears any significant resemblance to W.

== See also ==
- History of free and open-source software
