= XWinLogon =

XWinLogon is an interface to the Cygwin/X Server (The graphical interface of an X Window System) to allow the user to easily connect to a Unix/Linux box from Windows computer. The XWinLogon system is free and stable, but has not been updated since 2004-11-22.

XWinLogon has a Windows installer that makes installation easy. This installer copies the required packages of Cygwin and the frontend window that can be used to easily start an X session on a remote computer.

A known problem with XWinLogon is that it conflicts with an existing Cygwin installation.

== See also ==
- xrdp allows remote connection to a Linux installation through the native Windows RDP protocol
