= David Dawes =

Software developer (born 1964)

David Dawes (born 3 December 1964), is one of the founders of the XFree86 project. He was one of four people who started it in 1992 (together with David Wexelblat, Glenn Lai, and Jim Tsillas), and became the project president in 1994.

The XFree86 Project used the MIT/X11 license until 2004, when Dawes, as the XFree86 president, decided to license XFree86 4.4 under the newly devised XFree86 License 1.1. The new license includes a "credit clause" similar to the old BSD License advertising clause. The Free Software Foundation determined that the new license was incompatible with the version 2 of GNU GPL. The move was protested by free software leaders such as Richard Stallman and Theo de Raadt.

While Dawes explained this as an attempt to make sure the XFree86 developers get their due credit (apparently in response to the Xouvert fork), the decision was contested in the XFree86 community, notably by Jim Gettys and Keith Packard, and the dissenters subsequently forked the project into the X.Org Server. The fork superseded XFree86, as other projects found the new license unacceptable.

Dawes still heads the XFree86 Project and maintains XFree86 without corporate sponsorships; however, the last release of the software was in 2008. Dawes also runs his own small private company called X-Oz Technologies, which provides project management and consulting services.
