= Neatx =

Software created by Google

- Original author: www.nomachine.com
- Developer: Google
- Release: July 7, 2009; 17 years ago
- Preview release: 0.3.1 / 2009
- Written in: Python, C
- Operating system: Linux
- Available in: English
- Type: Remote administration software
- License: GNU General Public License
- Website: Official Webpage

Neatx is an open-source NX server based on NoMachine's NX technology. It is created by Google. Neatx is written mostly in Python, with the exception of very few wrapper scripts in bash and one program written in C. Neatx is free and open-source software, subject to the requirements of the GNU General Public License (GPL), version 2.

== History ==
Google announced the release of Neatx on July 7, 2009; there is no longer any active development on the project.

The source repository was last updated in February 2010.

== See also ==
- Comparison of remote desktop software
- Remmina
