= X Image Extension =

Extension for X Window System

X Image Extension, or XIE was an extension to the X Window System to enhance its graphics capability. It was intended to provide a powerful mechanism for the transfer and display of virtually any image on any X-capable hardware. It was first released with X11R6 in 1994. It is no longer included in the X11 reference distribution, having been removed with X11R6.7 in 2004.

XIE never gained significant usage — according to Jim Gettys, "it failed due to excessive complexity and lack of a good implementation."

While not intended for use as a general-purpose image-processing engine, XIE did provide a set of image rendition and enhancement primitives that could be combined into arbitrarily complex expressions. XIE also provided import and export facilities for moving images between client and server, and for accessing images as resources. The client side programming library, XIElib, was documented in the Prentice Hall book Developing Imaging Applications with XIElib by Syd Logan (ISBN 0-13-442914-1). In addition to the server and client library, a performance and test tool, xieperf, was included in X11R6. This client was also written by Syd Logan.

XIE was developed under contract to the X Consortium by a San Diego, CA company (no longer extant) called AGE Logic. Principal team members include Larry Hare, Bob Shelley, Dr. Dean Verheiden, Dr. Ben Fahey, Dr. Gary Rogers, and Syd Logan.

For all practical purposes, the Image Extension is obsolete. Adequate image performance is instead gained through use of the ubiquitous MIT-SHM extension, which allows transfer of large images between the client and server on the same machine (the common use-case) via shared memory.

== See also ==
- The Open Group
- POSIX
- X/Open Portability Guide
