= SharedX =

X Window extension

SharedX is a set of extensions to the X Window System that was developed at HP in the mid to late 1980s. It enables X servers to "share" individual X windows or an entire desktop, thus allowing users at multiple workstations to use standard applications to collaborate in real-time in an X Window System network environment, similar to desktop sharing, but for only a single window.

== System ==
A decade later, this capability would be termed "desktop sharing", with VNC being a major player. One difference between VNC and SharedX is that SharedX allows fine-grained sharing of any X window or group of X windows among any number of users, while VNC only allows sharing of the entire desktop.

SharedX was conceived by Philip Gust at HP Labs, where he developed several implementations between 1986 and 1987. It was first presented and demonstrated at the 2nd Annual X Technical Conference. A proxy server version based on X11 protocol extensions was subsequently developed by Philip Gust and his team at HP Labs, including Dan Garfinkel, Steve Lowder, and Mike Lemon. This version was presented and demonstrated at the 3rd Annual X Technical Conference.

In addition to window sharing, this version of SharedX also provided extensible "floor control" policies to mediate multi-user interaction, and meeting tools such as virtual meeting rooms, avatars, "telepointers" and voting. Functions such as calendaring, note taking, and "whiteboarding" were provided by sharing standard desktop applications. An experimental video sharing and teleconferencing system was also developed by Darren Leigh, an MIT intern working with the team.

The SharedX technology subsequently transferred to a product division, where it was incorporated into HP's X Window server that is supplied in versions of HP-UX. An article on SharedX later appeared in the Hewlett-Packard Journal

A number of subsequent research projects and publications have built on or cited SharedX.
