= XF86Config =

The configuration file XF86Config of the XFree86 project is used by the X server to set necessary configuration parameters.

It is a plain text file ordered into sections and subsections. Important sections are Files, InputDevice, Monitor, Modes, Screen, Device, and ServerLayout.

Sections can appear in any order and there may be more than one section of each kind, for example, if you have more than one monitor, say a video projector and an onboard LCD of a notebook.

The Monitor sections are for the physical displaying devices, the Screen sections are for the logical displays, so you can have two monitors displaying the same content or entirely different information.

The option "SWCursor" in the Device section for example controls whether the mouse pointer is mirrored on an external monitor or suppressed.

On typical Unix-like systems the file often is found in /etc/X11 and a log file is in /var/log, typically named XFree86.0.log for the last start of X and XFree86.0.log.old for the previous one.

Inappropriate editing of this file may result in a black or illegible screen or might even damage the monitor, especially if it is a CRT. The user should be able to operate the system through console mode (i.e. "text mode") when configuring X, as X might fail to start due to an invalid configuration leaving the user with merely the CLI.

== Xorg.conf ==
In the X.org Server fork of the XFree86 project, the file is called xorg.conf, but the specification is nearly identical. The X.org Server tries, however, to autoconfigure as much as possible with the aim of making xorg.conf unnecessary in the greatest proportion of cases.

== See also ==
- XFree86 Modeline
