= Xorg.conf =

The file xorg.conf is a file used for configuring the X.Org Server. While typically located in /etc/X11/xorg.conf, its location may vary across operating system distributions..

For a long time, editing xorg.conf was necessary for advanced input devices and multiple monitor output to work correctly. In modern systems this is seldom necessary due to input hotplugging and the XRandR extension integrated into new X.org releases. Some devices still require manual editing, notably components utilizing proprietary drivers may require explicit configuration, in order for Xorg to load them.

== See also ==
- XF86Config
- XFree86 Modeline
