= X-Win32 =

- Developer: StarNet Communications Inc
- Stable release: v19.1 / February 13, 2020; 6 years ago
- Operating system: Microsoft Windows
- Type: Display server
- License: Proprietary
- Website: www.starnet.com

In computing, X-Win32 is a proprietary implementation of the X Window System for Microsoft Windows, produced by StarNet Communications. It is based on X11R7.4.

X- Win32 allows remote display of UNIX windows on Windows machines in a normal window alongside the other Windows applications

== Version History ==
X-Win32 was first introduced by StarNet Communications as a product called MicroX in 1991. As the internet became more widely used in the 1990s the name changed to X-Win32. The table below details the origination and transformation of MicroX into X-Win32.

A limited set of versions and their release notes are available from the product's website.

Release date	Version Name	Key Features
February 1991	MicroX 286	Original Product Release
February 1991	MicroX 386	Original Product Release
February 1993	Micro X-Win 2.1.0	none available
February 1993	Micro X-Win 2.5.1	none available
July 1993	Micro X-Win 2.5.2	none available
July 1993	Micro X-Win 2.5.4	none available
August 1993	Micro X-Win 2.6.1	none available
August 1993	Micro X-Win 2.8.7	none available
January 1996	X-Win32 3.2.7	First true X-Win32 split from MicroX
January 1997	Micro X-Win 2.8.8	none available
November 1997	MIcro X-Win32 4.0	Last MicroX version
June 6, 1998	X-Win98	Full Compatibility with Windows 98
September 8, 1998	4.1	Common Sessions, Hide Windows, Last Session Terminates, Auto Restart, Use/Send Xauth
January 11, 1999	4.1.1	Improved Common Session tools for Admins, Simple Registry Default tool
May 19, 1999	4.1.2	New Help System, Multiple Monitor Support
August 10, 1999	4.1.3	Windows 2000 Compatibility, High-Res Display Support
November 15, 1999	4.1.4	Long Term Maintenance Free licensing Option
May 5, 2000	5.0	X-Config Tool, Multiple XDMCP Session Support, Thin Client Support, Session Wizard, Multiple Network Card Support
February 19, 2001	5.1.1	Performance Improvements
May 8, 2001	5.1.2	Multicast Support
March 13, 2002	5.3	French, Spanish, Italian Language Support, Desktop Shortcuts, MSI Push Deployment Support
August 28, 2002	5.4	Error Logging, X-Admin32 tool
January 15, 2003	5.4.1	Command Line Option, Updated SSH Module
November 4, 2003	5.4.4	Session Migration Manager
March 9, 2004	6.0	Session Sorter, PuTTY included in install, Expanded Font Support
April 20, 2004	X-Win64	64-Bit version of X-Win32
September 28, 2005	7.0	6.8.2 X11 code, Instant Desktop, Screen Capture Tool, Support for 13 new X11 extensions
December 14, 2005	7.1	Crash Report Facility, Improved OpenGL support, Installshield Installer
December 18, 2005	7.5	Single 32/64 bit installer
July 24, 2006	8.0	High-Speed Window Manager, StarNet SSH Module, XML Session Configuration, New UI
October 26, 2006	8.1	Command Line, Telnet and Rlogin Support, Global Password Updating, Private Key Agent
January 8, 2007	X-Win32 Flash	USB Drive Support
August 4, 2008	9.2	Session Sharing
November 5, 2008	9.3	Sound Support in XDMCP
March 11, 2009	9.4	Linux Console Display, LIVE Indirect Mode added
August 15, 2009	9.5	Server-Side Sessions Data Configuration
December 8, 2009	2010	Sound over Internet, X11 7.1 Upgrade
March 3, 2010	2010.1	FIPS-140 Support
August 1, 2010	2012	LIVE Sessions Update, Direct2D Support, Reprise License Manager
June 1, 2014	2014	Error Corrections
July 31, 2017	18	UI Overhaul, Updated SSH Module
March 26, 2019	19	Added option to run X-Win32 in the system tray

== Features ==
- Standard connection protocols - X-Win32 offers six standard connection protocols: ssh, telnet, rexec, rlogin, rsh, and XDMCP
- Window modes - Like other X servers for Microsoft Windows, X-Win32 has two window modes, Single and Multiple. Single window mode contains all X windows with one large visible root window. Multiple window mode allows the Microsoft Window Manager to manage the X client windows
- Copy and paste - X-Win32 incorporates a clipboard manager which allows for dynamic copying and pasting of text from X clients to Windows applications and vice versa. A screen-shot tool saves to a PNG file.
- OpenGL support - X-Win32 uses the GLX extension which allows for OpenGL Support

== Related products ==
- X-Win32 Flash is a version of X-Win32 that can be installed and run directly from a USB Flash Drive

== Discontinued products ==
- X-Win64 was a version for 64-bit Windows, but the extended features in that version can now be found in the current version of X-Win32.
- X-Win32 LX was a free commercially supported X Server for Microsoft Windows which supported Microsoft Windows Services for UNIX (SFU).
- Recon-X was an add-on product for all X server products, including X-Win32 competitors such as Exceed and Reflection X, which added suspend and resume capabilities to running X sessions. Features of Recon-X were incorporated into the LIVE product line
- LinuxLIVE is a LIVE client for Linux systems
- MacLIVE is a LIVE client for Mac OS X systems
- LIVE Console is a LIVE client installed with the LIVE server which allows localhost LIVE connections to be made

== See also ==
- Cygwin/X - A free alternative
- Exceed - A commercial alternative
- Reflection X - A commercial alternative
- Xming - Donations or purchase required
