= Xmove =

X client to control remote window managers

xmove
- Original authors: Ethan Solomita, Peter Skopp, Ari Shamash
- Final release: 2.0beta2 / 14 November 1997; 28 years ago
- Written in: C
- Operating system: X Window System
- Type: Terminal multiplexer
- License: MIT/X Consortium License
- Website: None

xmove is a computer program that allows the movement of X Window System applications between different displays and the persistence of X applications across X server restarts. It solves a problem in the design of X, where an X client (an X application) is tied to the X server (X display) it was started on for its lifetime. Also, if the X server is shut down, the client application is forced to stop running.

xmove lets the client disconnect from its current X server, and connect to a new one, at any time. The transition is completely transparent to the client. xmove works by acting as a proxy between the client and server. It is a "pseudoserver" which stores enough server state so that clients can connect to a new server without being disrupted.

== See also ==
- xpra – a more recent tool which is similar to xmove
- the lbxproxy tool, which allows disconnecting and reconnecting
