= Bob Scheifler =

American computer scientist (born 1954)

Robert William Scheifler
- Born: June 24, 1954 (age 72); Kirkwood, Missouri, U.S.
- Education: Massachusetts Institute of Technology
- Known for: X Window System, Jini
- Scientific career
- Fields: Computer science

Robert William Scheifler (born June 24, 1954) is an American computer scientist. He was born in Kirkwood, Missouri. He is most notable for leading the development of the X Window System from the project's inception in 1984 until the closure of the MIT X Consortium in 1996. He later became one of the architects of the Jini architecture at Sun Microsystems.

Scheifler holds a B.S. in Mathematics and an M.S. in computer science from the Massachusetts Institute of Technology.
