= Niri =

Scrollable-tiling Wayland compositor

- Original author: YaLTeR
- Stable release: 26.04 / 25 April 2026; 6 months ago
- Written in: Rust
- Operating system: Unix-Like
- Type: Wayland compositor
- License: GPL-3.0
- Website: niri-wm.github.io/niri/
- Repository: github.com/niri-wm/niri

Niri (Note: Officially all lowercase, as: niri) is a scrollable tiling window manager and compositing manager for Wayland inspired by the GNOME extension PaperWM and written in Rust. Niri officially supports Fedora, Arch Linux, Ubuntu, and NixOS. It supports taskbars, output rotation, Inter-Process Communication (IPC), tablet mode switch, alt-tab switcher and screen reader.

In 2026, Niri was included for Archinstall 4.4.

== Features ==
- New Alt-Tab Switcher
- Dynamic workspaces
- Workspace Overview
- Tabbed Columns
- Shadows
- Window Moving
- Tablet Mode Switch
- Blur
- Animations
- Built in screenshot UI
- Gradient borders

== Reception ==
Niri has been praised for its touchpad gestures support and was adopted as the default window manager of KaOS, which abandoned KDE Plasma in order to avoid Systemd.

== See also ==
- List of display servers § Wayland
