= Low Bandwidth X =

Protocol to use X Window System

In computing, LBX, or Low Bandwidth X, is a protocol to use the X Window System over network links with low bandwidth and high latency. It was introduced in X11R6.3 ("Broadway") in 1996, but never achieved wide use. It was disabled by default as of X.Org Server 7.1, and was removed for version 7.2.

X was originally implemented for use with the server and client on the same machine or the same local area network. By 1996, the Internet was becoming popular, and X's performance over narrow, slow links was problematic.

LBX ran as a proxy server (lbxproxy). It cached commonly used information — connection setup, large window properties, font metrics, keymaps and so on — and compressed data transmission over the network link.

LBX was never widely deployed as it did not offer significant speed improvements. The slow links it was introduced to help were typically insecure, and RFB protocol (VNC) over a secure shell connection — which includes compression — proved faster than LBX, and also provided session resumption.

Finally, it was shown that greater speed improvements to X could be obtained for all networked environments with replacement of X's antiquated font system as part of the new composited graphics system, along with care and attention to application and widget toolkit design, particularly care to avoid network round trips and hence latency.

== See also ==
- Virtual Network Computing (VNC)
- xmove - a tool allows you to move programs between X Window System displays
- xpra - a more recent tool which is similar to xmove
- NX technology, an X acceleration system
