= X386 =

X386 was an implementation of the X Window System for IBM PC compatible computers. It ran on systems with Intel 386 or later processors, running Unix System V-based operating systems, and supported a variety of VGA-compatible graphics cards. X386 was created by Thomas Roell while at the Technical University of Munich and first released (as X386 1.1, based on X11R4) in 1991. X386 1.2 was incorporated in the X11R5 release later the same year.

Further X386 development was funded by Snitily Graphics Consulting Services, which released enhanced versions commercially. SGCS later became Xi Graphics and X386 evolved into the Accelerated-X product.

In September 1992, the XFree86 project was created to continue development of X386 as open source software, the name being a pun on "X386", distinguishing it from the proprietary SGCS version.
