= DirectFB =

Software library

- Original author: Denis Oliver Kropp
- Stable release: 1.7.7 / February 1, 2015; 11 years ago
- Written in: C
- Operating system: Linux, macOS
- Type: Library
- License: LGPLv2+
- Website: DirectFB web (archive.org)
- Repository: github.com/deniskropp/DirectFB

DirectFB2
- Developer: Nicolas Caramelli
- Website: directfb2.github.io
- Repository: github.com/directfb2

DirectFB (Direct Frame Buffer), now continued as DirectFB2, is a software library with a small memory footprint that provides graphics acceleration, input device handling and abstraction layer, and integrated windowing system with support for translucent windows and multiple display layers on top of the Linux framebuffer without requiring any kernel modifications. DirectFB is free and open-source software subject to the terms of the GNU Lesser General Public License (LGPL).

The library allows developers an alternative to a full X Window System (X11) server used in Unix-like operating systems. DirectFB allows applications to talk directly to video hardware through a direct API, speeding up and simplifying graphic operations.

It is often used by games and embedded systems developers to circumvent the overhead of a full X Window System server implementation. In 2006, a version of DirectFB was included in the software stack for the CE Linux Forum's Audio/Video Graphics Specification V2.

DirectFB can host XDirectFB, a rootless X server implementation that uses DirectFB windows for X11 top-level windows. XDirectFB is an interface that mimics the X11 interface through the DirectFB API to simplify running applications written for X11 on DirectFB.

DirectFBGL is an OpenGL extension for DirectFB/XDirectFB that uses Direct Rendering Infrastructure (DRI) in the Mesa 3D library to support OpenGL hardware acceleration.

Among the products that use DirectFB are Roku, LinuxTV, Ben Nanonote, the unreleased Palm Foleo mobile companion, the webOS operating system, Panasonic Viera Connect TVs and the Philips TVs based on jointSPACE.

== See also ==
- Direct Rendering Manager
- KMS driver
- General Graphics Interface
- Linux framebuffer
- SVGAlib, a low-level graphics library which runs on Linux and FreeBSD
