= Commercial =

Commercial may refer to:

- (adjective for) commerce, a system of voluntary exchange of products and services
  - (adjective for) trade, the trading of something of economic value such as goods, services, information or money
- a dose of advertising conveyed through media (such as radio or television)
  - Radio advertisement
  - Television advertisement
- Two functional constituencies in elections for the Legislative Council of Hong Kong:
  - Commercial (First)
  - Commercial (Second)
- Commercial (album), a 2009 album by Los Amigos Invisibles
- Commercial broadcasting
- Commercial style or early Chicago school, an American architectural style
- Commercial Drive, Vancouver, a road in Vancouver, British Columbia, Canada
- Commercial Township, New Jersey, in Cumberland County, New Jersey

== See also ==
- Comercial (disambiguation), Spanish and Portuguese word for the same thing
- Commercialism
