= Virtual console =

Software emulation of a computer terminal

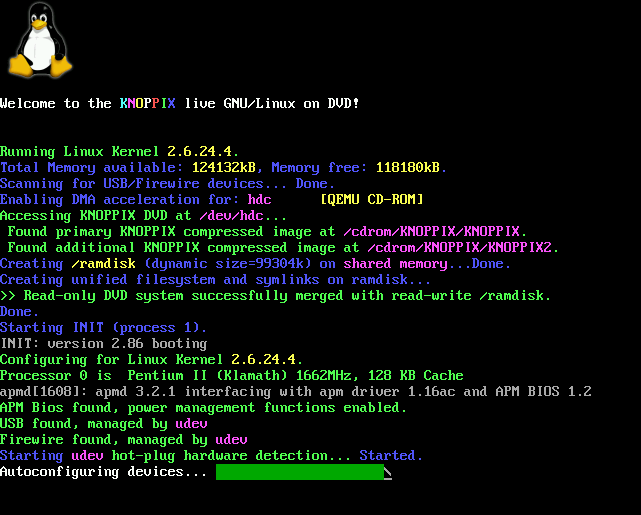
Virtual console showing Knoppix boot messages

A virtual console (VC) – also known as a virtual terminal (VT) – is a conceptual combination of the keyboard and display for a computer user interface. It is a feature of some Unix-like operating systems such as Linux, BSD, illumos, UnixWare, and macOS in which the system console of the computer can be used to switch between multiple virtual consoles to access unrelated user interfaces. Virtual consoles date back at least to Xenix and Concurrent CP/M in the 1980s.

In the Linux console and other platforms, usually the first six virtual consoles provide a text terminal with a login prompt to a Unix shell. The graphical X Window System traditionally starts in the seventh virtual console (tty7), although this is configuration dependent. In Linux, the user switches between them by pressing the Alt key combined with a function key – for example Alt + F1 to access the virtual console number 1. Alt + ← changes to the previous virtual console and Alt + → to the next virtual console. To switch from the X Window System or a Wayland compositor, Ctrl + Alt + F1 works. (Note that users can redefine these default key combinations.)

If several sessions of the X Window System are required to run in parallel, such as in the case of fast user switching or when debugging X programs on a separate X server, each X session usually runs in a separate virtual console.

== Unix systems ==
Unix workstations provided virtual terminal capabilities. For instance, Xenix on the Apple Lisa provided three virtual terminals. In the IBM PC RT, IBM enhanced Unix System V to add multiple full-screen virtual terminals, doing so in the system's Virtual Resource Manager. Unix System V subsequently provided virtual terminal support using the Virtual Terminal Manager program, this being used to support AT&T's FACE (Framed Access Command Environment) product. In Unix System V Release 4 (SVR4), the vtlmgr program supported the use of hot keys to switch between virtual terminals. Such an approach was employed by the Amiga Unix port of SVR4, utilising a combination of Alt and a function key to select a "virtual screen". However, unlike traditional virtual consoles, these virtual screens were capable of running graphical programs including distinct OPEN LOOK graphical sessions. Other systems, such as Acorn RISC iX provided virtual terminal navigation facilities.

Sun Niagara-based servers running virtualization with Logical Domains get virtual console services from the Control domain.

== See also ==
- Virtual desktop, works similar to a virtual console, but operates on graphical desktops instead of a command prompt
- System console for the non-virtual console
- Text terminal for the textual interface in general
- Pseudo terminal for even more virtual consoles
- Terminal emulator for an application program that has the same function as a textual virtual console
