= Linux framebuffer =

Abstraction layer for Linux kernel to show graphics on the system console

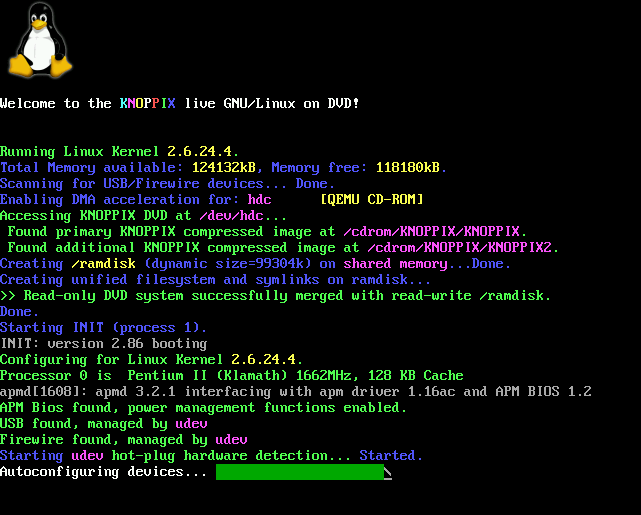
Knoppix booting on the framebuffer

The framebuffer subsystem in the Linux kernel fbdev is used to show graphics on a computer monitor, typically on the system console.

It was designed as a hardware-independent API to give user space software access to the framebuffer (the part of a computer's video memory containing a current video frame) using only the Linux kernel's own basic facilities and its device file system interface, avoiding the need for libraries like SVGAlib which effectively implemented video drivers in user space.

In most applications, fbdev has been superseded by the Linux Direct Rendering Manager (DRM) subsystem, but as of 2022, several drivers provide both DRM and fbdev APIs for backwards compatibility with software that has not been updated to use the DRM system, and there are still fbdev drivers for older (mostly embedded) hardware that does not have a DRM driver.

== Applications ==
There are three applications of the Linux framebuffer:

- An implementation of text Linux console that doesn't use hardware text mode (useful when that mode is unavailable, or to overcome its restrictions on glyph size, number of code points, etc.). One popular aspect of this is the ability to have console show the Tux logo at boot up.
- A graphic output method for a display server, independent of video adapter hardware and its drivers.
- Graphic programs avoiding the overhead of the X Window System.

Examples of the third application include Linux programs such as MPlayer, links2, NetSurf, w3m, fbff, fbida, and fim, and libraries such as GLUT, SDL (version 1.2), GTK, and Qt, which can all use the framebuffer directly. This use case is particularly popular in embedded systems.

DirectFB2 is another project aimed at providing a framework for hardware acceleration of the Linux framebuffer.

There was also a windowing system called FramebufferUI (fbui) implemented in kernel space that provided a basic two-dimensional windowing experience with very little memory use.

== History ==
Linux has had generic framebuffer support since the 2.1.109 kernel.

It was originally implemented to allow the kernel to emulate a text console on systems such as the Apple Macintosh that do not have a text-mode display, and was later expanded to the IBM PC compatible platform.

== See also ==
- Direct Rendering Infrastructure
- Kernel mode setting
