= Xming =

X11 display server for Windows

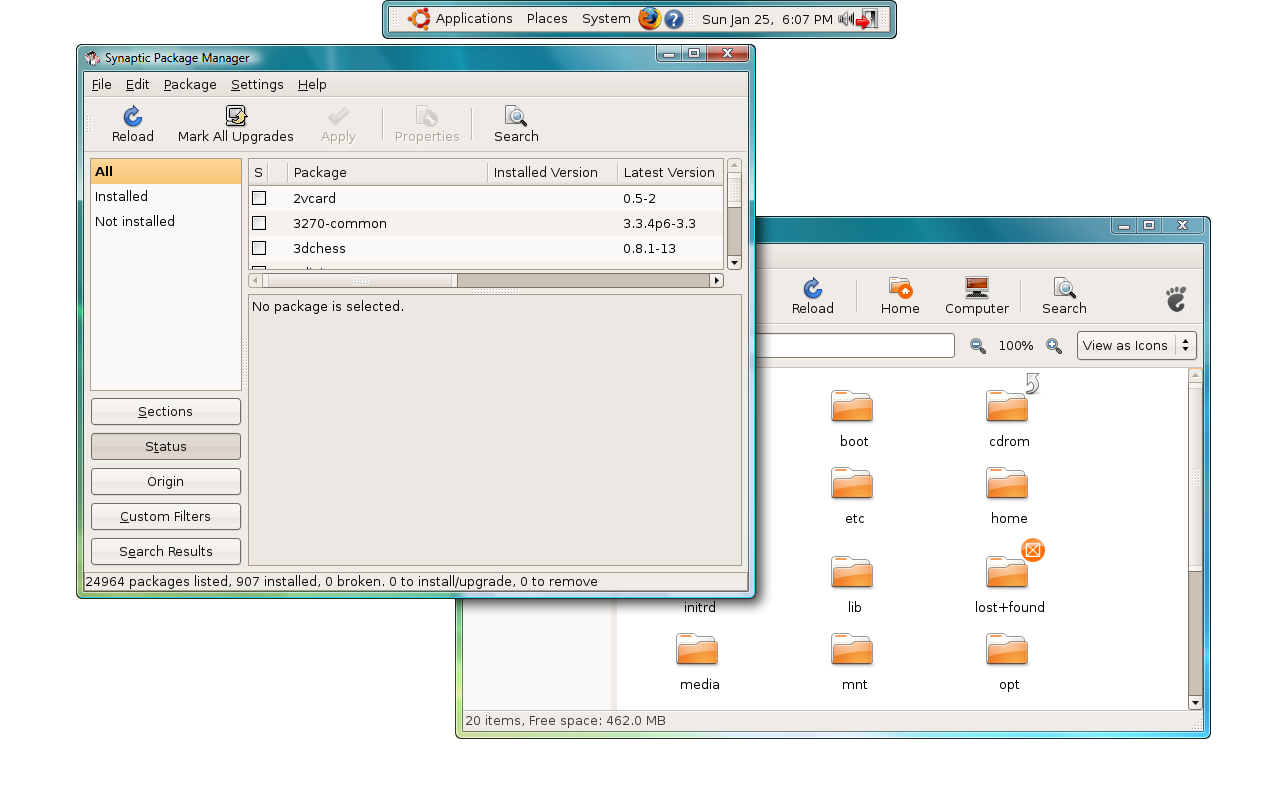
- Xming displaying Synaptic and Nautilus
- Original author: Alexander Gottwald (2004–2005)
- Developers: Alexander Gottwald (?–2005); Colin Harrison(2005 - present)
- Initial release: November 9, 2004; 21 years ago
- Stable release: 7.7.1.9, proprietary 6.9.0.31, MIT License / November 6, 2024; 18 months ago, proprietary May 4, 2007; 19 years ago, MIT License
- Operating system: Microsoft Windows XP/Server 2003/Vista/Server 2008/7/Server 2012/8.x/10
- Type: Display server
- License: Proprietary software
- Website: www.straightrunning.com/XmingNotes/

Xming is an X11 display server for Microsoft Windows operating systems, including Windows XP and later.

== Features ==
Xming provides the X Window System display server, a set of traditional sample X applications and tools, as well as a set of fonts. It features support of several languages and has Mesa 3D, OpenGL, and GLX 3D graphics extensions capabilities.

The Xming X server is based on Cygwin/X, the X.Org Server. It is cross-compiled on Linux with the MinGW compiler suite and the Pthreads-Win32 multi-threading library. Xming runs natively on Windows and does not need any third-party emulation software.

Xming may be used with implementations of Secure Shell (SSH) to securely forward X11 sessions from other computers. It supports PuTTY and ssh.exe, and comes with a version of PuTTY's plink.exe. The Xming project also offers a portable version of PuTTY. When SSH forwarding is not used, the local file Xn.hosts must be updated with host name or IP address of the remote machine where the GUI application is started.

The software has been recommended by authors of books on free software when a free X server is needed, and described as simple and easier to install though less configurable than other popular free choices like Cygwin/X.

== Transition to proprietary license ==
Since May 2007, payment must be made to download new releases. Purchasing a license will allow the user access to new downloads for one year; however, MIT-licensed releases (referred to by the author as "public domain" releases) can still be downloaded with no payment on SourceForge.

== See also ==
- Cygwin/X
