= SVGALib =

Linux SuperVGA Graphics Library

SVGAlib
- Original author: Harm Hanemaayer
- Developer: Matan Ziv-Av
- Initial release: 1992-1993
- Stable release: 1.4.3 / June 2, 2001; 24 years ago
- Preview release: 1.9.25 / July 14, 2007; 18 years ago
- Written in: C
- Operating system: AmigaOS, Linux, FreeBSD
- Platform: PPC, x86, x86-64
- Type: Library
- License: Copyright by respective authors, generic permissive license
- Website: www.svgalib.org

SVGAlib, styled as "Linux SuperVGA Graphics Library", is a legacy open-source low-level graphics library for accessing SuperVGA hardware on PC-compatible systems running on Linux, with later ports to AmigaOS and FreeBSD. SVGAlib allowed programs to change video mode to display full-screen graphics, without the use of a windowing system. Alongside X11 and the General Graphics Interface, it was one of the earliest libraries allowing graphical video games on Linux.

Although still available online, SVGAlib has seen no code releases since July 2006 (19 years ago) and would be considered superseded and discontinued.

== History ==
The first version of SVGAlib was based on version 1.2 of another library, VGAlib by Tommy Frandsen. SVGAlib added support for many more SuperVGA chipsets and video modes.

Several games like Ambrosia Software's Maelstrom by Sam Lantinga, the first-person games Freaks! and Space Plumber using the QDGDF library, and most famously id Software's Doom (alongside an X11 version) and Quake (after the submission of a third-party patch based on leaked source code) were ported to use SVGAlib from other operating systems, as was Doom porter Dave Taylor's Abuse.

Wolfenstein 3D was also ported following its source code being released in 1995, as well as the id produced Heretic, Hexen and Hexen II after 1999, and Descent and Descent II by Parallax Software after 1998. Certain source ports for Doom, Quake, and Abuse maintained support for SVGAlib. The library is also supported by the MAME/MESS emulator.

First party Linux games that have supported it include Alizarin Tetris, Bdash, Fleuch, Hatman, Intelligent FRAC, Koules, LinCity, Linberto, Quadra, Repton, SABRE, Thrust (also supported GGI), Zarch, and Zblast, among others.

SVGAlib was popular in the mid to late 1990s. A reference book, Linux Graphics Programming with SVGAlib, was authored by Jay Link in 2000. Around the turn of the millennium, many applications that used it migrated to X11 and SDL, which could (until SDL 2.0) make use of SVGAlib as a video driver. This was in part due to the risks of privilege escalation due to SVGAlib requiring applications to be run as the 'root' user.
