= Xbase-clients =

Tools and utilities for the X Window System

Xbase-Clients is a suite of tools and utilities for the X Window System.

== Included tools ==
- editres, which queries and updates the X resource database
- startx and xinit, which initialize X sessions from the command line
- xauth, a tool for controlling access to the X session
- xbiff, a tool which tells you when you have new email
- xcalc, a scientific calculator desktop accessory
- xclipboard, a tool to manage cut-and-pasted text selections
- xcutsel, which exchanges selection and cut buffer contents
- xedit, a text editor
- xev, an X event displayer
- xhost, a tool to add or remove access to the X server for specified hosts
- xman, a manual page browser
- Xmark, tool for benchmarking graphical operations
- xrandr, a command-line interface to the RandR extension
- xsm, a session manager for X sessions
- xwd and xwud, utilities for taking and viewing window dumps ("screenshots") of the X session

== Demos ==
- xeyes, in which a pair of eyes track the pointer

== See also ==
- xterm
