= Exa (disambiguation) =

Exa or EXA may refer to:

- exa-, a metric prefix denoting a factor of 10^{18}
- EXA, a graphics acceleration architecture
- Ecuadorian Civilian Space Agency
- Exa Corporation, an American software developer
- Exa TV, a Mexican television channel
- My-HiME EXA, an anime comedy series
- Nissan EXA, an automobile
- Shining Force EXA, a video game
- Exa, a range of small-format Exakta cameras
- exa (command-line utility), a program for listing files
- Exa Dark Sideræl Musk, daughter of Grimes and Elon Musk
