= Parcellite =

Linux clipboard manager

- Original author: Gilberto "Xyhthyx" Miralla
- Developer: Doug Springer
- Stable release: 1.2.2 / 2023-03-11
- Platform: BSD, Linux, OS X
- Available in: Multilingual
- License: GNU GPL
- Website: parcellite.sourceforge.net

Parcellite is a lightweight, tiny and free clipboard manager for Linux with a small memory footprint.

== Fork ==
ClipIt
- Original author: Gilberto "Xyhthyx" Miralla
- Developer: Cristian Henzel
- Stable release: 1.4.5 / 2020-06-11
- Platform: BSD, Linux, OS X
- Available in: Multilingual
- License: GNU GPL
- Website: github.com/shantzu/ClipIt

Since development of Parcellite has slowed, a fork of it, ClipIt has appeared. Developed by Cristian Henzel, it fixes numerous bugs and offers a better user experience; however, the last commit was in 2018. Most importantly, it improves support for Unity AppIndicators, UTF-8, and adds support for GTK+ 3, last commit

== Similar software ==
- Glipper
- Klipper
- Diodon

== See also ==
- Clipboard manager
