= Clipboard manager =

Computer program

A clipboard manager or clipboard extender is software that provides cut, copy, and paste functionality that augments or replaces the native clipboard functionality of a computer system. Many systems provide only one buffer for the clipboard that is overwritten by each cut and copy operation whereas a clipboard manager/extender often adds additional buffers and user interface for using them.

A clipboard manager enhances the basic clipboard functions with one or more of the following features:

- Multiple buffers
- Merge, split, and edit buffers
- Select which buffer to overwrite for a cut or copy operation
- Select which buffer to use for a paste operation
- Handle formatted text, tabular data, data objects, media content, and URLs
- Save buffer to long-term storage
- Index or tag buffer data
- Search buffer data
- Sharing clipboard contents remotely (pastebin)
- Create a new buffer for each cut or copy operation

Some applications provide clipboard features that pertain only within the application or a limited context. This is a feature in editors like vi and emacs. Versions of Microsoft Office starting with Office 2000 have included the "Office Clipboard", a built-in clipboard manager, which operates as long as one of the Office suite applications is open.

== Examples ==
=== Windows ===
The built-in Windows clipboard manager maintains the clipboard buffer at the system level, permitting data transfer between applications; copied data may thus be pasted even after an application is closed. A range of cells clipped from an Excel sheet can be pasted as a table into Word or LibreOffice Writer. Formatted text clipped from a web page will become cells in an Excel sheet, a table in MS Word, or plain text in Notepad. In Windows 10 and above, the clipboard manager can be accessed with the keyboard shortcut Win + V.

ClipBook Viewer is a discontinued utility included in the Windows NT family until the release of Windows Vista.

Windows versions prior to the Windows 10 October 2018 Update do not offer a copy history feature. In these versions a third-party clipboard manager that replaces the default clipboard is required for extended functionality. The Windows 10 October 2018 Update introduced a new Cloud Clipboard feature which does offer copy history, as well as the ability to sync this history for access on other devices.

Notable clipboard managers include: ClipX and Shapeshifter.

=== Mac OS X ===
Mac OS X also has a host of third-party options for clipboard management.

CopyPaste was the first (1997) multiple clipboard utility, the only for many years and is still actively developed. (Shareware) CopyPaste was first reviewed in 1997 by Tidbits. and also by WIRED.

Clipboard managers for Mac OS X use the Dock, status bar or Dashboard to integrate with the Mac look and feel.

=== Linux ===
The freedesktop.org Clipboard Manager specification describes a protocol layered on top of the ICCCM clipboard spec for client applications. A daemon process is responsible for storing clipboard contents. This daemon clipboard manager must be provided by the window manager running in the user's X session. The client-side specification has native support in a number of toolkits, including GTK.

GNOME provides a basic clipboard manager function as part of the gnome-control-center (accessed via the gnome-settings-daemon), that supports the freedesktop.org Clipboard Manager Specification.

Notable clipboard managers include: Diodon, Glipper, Klipper, and Parcellite.
