= XFS (disambiguation) =

XFS is a computer file system created by Silicon Graphics.

XFS may also refer to:

- X Font Server, a standard mechanism for an X server to communicate with a font renderer
- CEN/XFS, a client-server architecture for financial applications on the Microsoft Windows platform
- Exfoliation syndrome, an eye ailment

== See also ==
- Extent File System (EFS), a file system superseded by XFS
