= Shape extension =

Extension that allows windows to be given arbitrary, non-rectangular shapes

X Nonrectangular Window Shape Extension
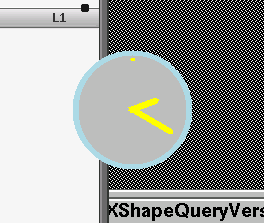
- The round oclock window.
- Original author(s): X.Org Foundation
- Stable release: 1.1 / 2006; 19 years ago

In the X Window System, the X Nonrectangular Window Shape Extension allows windows to be given arbitrary, non-rectangular shapes.

Two well-known applets that use the shape extension are oclock, which is a simple round analog clock, and xeyes, which shows two googly eyes that follow the cursor on the screen as if they were watching it. Most X systems have one or the other (or both) in their standard installations. In addition, some window managers use the shape extension to draw non-rectangular icons.

== Implementation ==
Applications can only create rectangular windows, but can then change their shape to be an arbitrary part of the original rectangle. The remaining area of the rectangle is not only transparent (shows what is below the window); rather, it is not part of the window at all. For example, if a window is shaped with a hole in the middle, not only the hole shows what is below the window, but a click in the hole is considered to be a click in what is below the window.

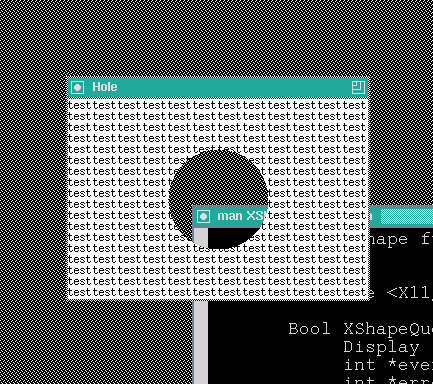
A window having a rectangular outline but a hole in the middle.

Applications create windows as usual (specifying width and height), but can then change the shape of a window to be a subset of the original area. by sending the X display server either a list of rectangles or a pixmap of color depth one (a black-and-white pixmap). More precisely, a client can request the rectangles or the pixmap to be set as the new shape, but also to be combined in various ways (e.g., intersected or added) with the old shape. A third way for changing the shape of a window is by using the current shape of a window or a part of it.

The extension allows defining the shape of two separate regions: the clipping and the bounding regions. These two areas are defined even for windows not using the shape extension: the clipping region is the area that can be used for drawing, the bounding region is the total area covered by the window (that is, the clipping region plus the border). The shape extension allows defining two independent shapes for these two regions.

Both the clipping and bounding are associated, in the shape extension, two areas: a default rectangular region and a possibly non-rectangular client region, defined and changed by the client as specified above. The effective region, which is the actual shape of the window, is the intersection of these two areas. This intersection is performed every time either region is changed: for example, if the client regions contains parts that are outside the default region but the default region is then enlarged, the effective region will include these parts.

== See also ==
- X Window System core protocol
