= X security =

X security may refer to:

- X Window authorization
- Security categories in India
