= XCL =

XCL is a three-letter abbreviation with multiple meanings, as described below:

- Xlib Compatibility Layer
- Cluff Lake Airport, the IATA airport code
- Classical Armenian, the ISO 639-3 code being xcl.
- eXtensible Characterisation Language developed at the University of Cologne
- the XML interchange format for Common logic
