= Eza =

Eza or EZA may refer to:

- Ezaa language
- Èze, a commune in the Alpes-Maritimes department, France
- Eznis Airways, a defunct Mongolian airline
- Elorza Airport
- eza, a fork, and continuation of exa, a command-line utility for listing files.
