= Xephyr =

Display server software

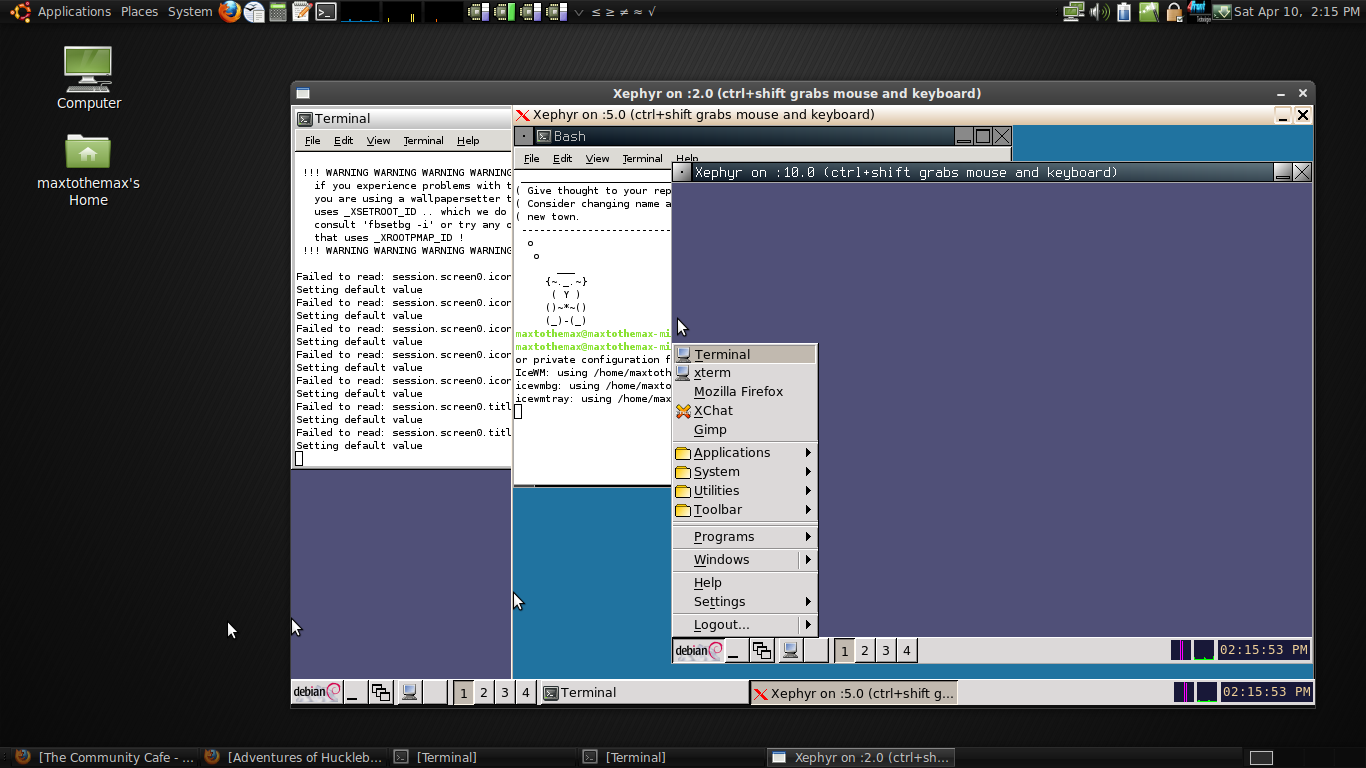
- Three recursive levels of nested Xephyr sessions, running on Linux Mint
- Original author(s): Matthew Allum
- Developer(s): freedesktop.org
- Initial release: January 1, 2007; 18 years ago
- Written in: C
- Type: Display server
- License: MIT License
- Website: freedesktop.org/wiki/Software/Xephyr/

Xephyr is a display server software implementing the X11 display server protocol based on KDrive which targets a window on a host X Server as its framebuffer. It is written by Matthew Allum. Xephyr is an X-on-X implementation and runs on X.Org Server and can work with Glamor. Future versions could make use of libinput. Replacing Xephyr with the xf86-video-dummy and xf86-video-nested drivers in the normal X.Org server is being considered as part of X11R7.8.

== Features ==
Unlike the similar Xnest, Xephyr supports modern X extensions (even if the host server does not) such as composite, damage, and randr. It uses SHM images and shadow framebuffer updates to provide good performance. It also has a visual debugging mode for observing screen updates.

== Limitations ==
Xorg's version of Xephyr uses only software rendering for OpenGL, but Feng Haitao has developed a forked version of Xephyr which can do hardware-accelerated rendering if the underlying X server has the capability.

== See also ==
- Thin client
- rio (windowing system)
