= Cursor warping =

Mouse warping or cursor warping is the positioning of the cursor by the computer system rather than by the user's manipulation. For example, some window managers, such as AfterStep, awesome, and wmii, automatically position the pointer to the centre of the current application window when that application is made current.

Warping can also refer to shifting the mouse between monitors.
