= Keith Packard =

American software developer (born 1963)

- Born: April 16, 1963 (age 63)
- Education: BA in mathematics
- Occupation: Programmer
- Employer: Amazon
- Known for: Programming
- Board member of: X.Org Foundation
- Website: keithp.com

Keith Packard (born April 16, 1963) is a software developer, best known for his work on the X Window System.

Packard is responsible for many X extensions and technical papers on X. He has been heavily involved in the development of X since the late 1980s as a member of the MIT X Consortium, XFree86 and the X.Org Foundation.

In 2011, O'Reilly awarded an open source award to Packard, as "the person behind most of the improvements made on the open source desktop in the last ten years at least." He is portrayed as one of the Faces of Open Source.

== Career ==
An interview with Packard (center) and Bdale Garbee at linux.conf.au 2014.

Packard gained a BA in mathematics from Reed College, Oregon in 1986. He worked at Tektronix, Inc. in Wilsonville, Oregon designing X terminals and Unix workstations from 1983 until 1988.

He then moved to Cambridge, Massachusetts to work at the Massachusetts Institute of Technology X Consortium from 1988 to 1992, developing the X Window System reference implementation and standards as the senior member of a small team. He was responsible for X releases at this time. In 1992 he returned to Portland, Oregon to work for Network Computing Devices on X terminals and computer graphics. From 1999 he worked for SuSE from his home in Portland, Oregon on the XFree86 implementation of X. He worked at the Cambridge Research Labs of Compaq (and then Hewlett-Packard) from 2001 until 2005 when the lab closed down. In 2003 he was ejected from XFree86. This led to the formation of the successful X.Org Server fork. He is now project lead on the X.org project, the official reference implementation of the X Window System.

Packard became a Debian Developer in 2004, maintaining font-config (as well as being the upstream maintainer) and other packages. Packard began working for Intel in August 2006. Packard joined Debian's Technical committee in November 2013. Packard started working at Hewlett-Packard's HP Labs in January 2015. Packard started consulting for Valve in March 2017. Packard left HP Labs to join SiFive in July 2019, working on free software for RISC-V-based processors, among other tasks. Packard joined Amazon in May 2021.

== Other interests ==
Keith is a radio ham with callsign K7WQ. He is on the board of directors of Amateur Radio Digital Communications (ARDC).

== Software Packard has worked on ==
- Cairo
- X Window System extensions: XRender, XFixes, XDamage, XComposite, XRandR
- KDrive
- font-config, Xft
- Nickle
- XDM
- Direct Rendering Infrastructure
- Snek
- USB Chaos-Key driver in the Linux kernel
- Zephyr
