= UMA Acceleration Architecture =

The XAA/EXA/UXA/SNA APIs are for the 2D graphics drivers inside the X server. Note, that modern software uses direct rendering.

Glamor obsoletes DDX, here with XWayland.

In computing, UMA Acceleration Architecture (UXA) is the reimplementation of the EXA graphics acceleration architecture of the X.Org Server developed by Intel. Its major difference with EXA is the use of GEM, replacing Translation Table Maps. In February 2009 it became clear that UXA would not be merged back into EXA.

Intel is transitioning from UXA to SNA.

== Implementations ==
In May 2009 it was announced that Ubuntu would migrate their graphics acceleration for the Ubuntu 9.10 release to UXA.

== See also ==
- Direct Rendering Infrastructure
- Mesa 3D
- EGL
