= ClipX =

Clipboard history manager

- Original author(s): Francis Gastellu
- Stable release: 1.0.3.8 / Nov. 30th, 2005
- Preview release: 1.0.3.9 / Jul. 6th, 2008
- Platform: Windows
- Available in: English
- License: freeware
- Website: http://bluemars.org/clipx/

ClipX is a tiny clipboard history manager for Windows. ClipX is fairly easy to use and it is offered free of charge, but it does not offer the advanced clip-management features found in similar applications.

== Features ==
This simple clipboard program captures text and images copied to the Windows Clipboard and allows the user to access a history of copied items, any item of which can be reselected for pasting.

ClipX can be recalled via a hotkey and supports both bitmap and text clipboards. ClipX offers a simple right-click menu for accessing copied items and configuring the program, while a left-click displays recently copied items. Under Configuration, you can specify how many clips the program retains and whether it should ignore text or bitmap files. Default hot keys let you pull up the list of clips, search ClipX's simple manager for a specific clip, or launch an online search for an item, but it does not offer hotkeys for individual clips or support drag and drop for easily inserting clips. The program does not retain text formatting, but it does work with image files. You also can save a set of clips and reload them as needed across sessions.

ClipX is no longer supported.

The need for the utility decreased sharply with the introduction of the clipboard history feature introduced with Windows 10, which can be enabled by inputting ⊞ Win+V.
