= SNA (computer graphics) =

The XAA/EXA/UXA/SNA APIs are for the 2D graphics drivers inside the X server. Note, that modern software uses direct rendering.

Glamor obsoletes DDX, here with XWayland.

In computing, SNA (Sandybridge's New Acceleration) is a graphics acceleration architecture for the X.Org Server developed by Intel as a replacement for UXA.

== See also ==
- EXA
- UXA
- Direct Rendering Infrastructure
- Glamor
