= ClipBook Viewer =

Computer program

- ClipBook Viewer in Windows XP, with the words "Classic Windows Start Menu" on the clipboard
- Other names: Clipboard Viewer
- Developer: Microsoft
- Release: October 1992; 34 years ago
- Operating system: Microsoft Windows
- Service name: Clipbook
- Type: Clipboard manager
- License: Proprietary commercial software

ClipBook Viewer is a discontinued utility included in the Windows NT family of operating system that allows users to view the contents of the local clipboard, clear the clipboard, or save copied and cut items. A feature restricted version, called Clipboard Viewer, is available in Windows 9x and earlier.

ClipBook Viewer was first introduced in Windows for Workgroups 3.1. It allows users to store clipboard contents in ClipBook pages, share the contents of the clipboard with other users, or save the clipboard contents to a file (with .clp extension) to reuse them later. (Clipboard files cannot be shared.) The View menu allows viewing clipboard contents in various formats such as plain text, Unicode, HTML, RTF, and OLE private data. Windows XP, does not include it in the default Start menu. It can be accessed by launching its executable file, ClipBrd.exe.

Windows NT relies on NetDDE and a Windows service called "Clipbook" (with small "b") to share ClipBook pages. Each shared page support an access control list that defines whether they can be seen, linked to, or modified.

Windows Vista and later do not include ClipBook Viewer. Windows 10 and later include the Clipboard History feature (⊞ Win+V), which displays the last few clipboard contents.

== See also ==
- Clipboard manager – Computer program
- List of Microsoft Windows components
