= X.Org Foundation =

Nonprofit organization

- Founded: 22 January 2004; 22 years ago
- Type: Non-profit
- Product: X.Org Server
- Method: Development
- Parent organization: Software Freedom Conservancy
- Website: x.org

The X.Org Foundation is a non-profit corporation chartered to research, develop, support, organize, administrate, standardize, promote, and defend a free and open accelerated graphics stack. This includes, but is not limited to, the following projects: DRM, Mesa, Wayland, and X11 and its primary implementation, the X.Org Server.

== Organization ==
The X.Org Foundation was founded on 22 January 2004.

The modern X.Org Foundation came into being when the body that oversaw X standards and published the official reference implementation joined forces with former XFree86 developers. The creation of the Foundation marked a radical change in the governance of X (see the history of the X Window System). Whereas the stewards of X since 1988 (including the previous X.Org, part of The Open Group) had been vendor organizations, the Foundation is led by software developers and using community development on the bazaar model, which relies on outside involvement. Membership is also open to individuals, with corporate membership being in the form of sponsorship.

In 2005 the X.Org Foundation applied for 501(c)(3) non-profit status. In 2012, with the help of the Software Freedom Law Center (SFLC), the Foundation gained the status. In 2013, the Foundation lost the status because they did not fill a tax form (it had no income to declare and did not get any info from SFLC) and in the same year it regained the status, after clearing up the issue. In 2016, the X.Org Foundation joined Software in the Public Interest (SPI) who would manage the bureaucracy.

In 2019, freedesktop.org formally joined the X.Org Foundation.

In 2023, The X.Org Foundation decided to join Software Freedom Conservancy, which took over the bureaucratic roles SPI had had previously.

== Fields of activity ==
The X.Org Foundation does not provide technical guidance, roadmaps or deadlines, releases or supervision of any kind.

The X.Org Foundation does provide communication tools (in relation with freedesktop.org), an annual physical meeting and money to help developing the free graphics stack.

The X.Org Foundation organizes the annual X.Org Developer's Conference (XDC) and sponsors students to work on X.Org as part of their X.Org Endless Vacation of Code (EVoC) initiative.

The X.Org Server and xlib are the reference implementation of the X protocol, and is commonly used on Linux and UNIX; it is the fundamental technology underlying both the modern GNOME and KDE desktops and older CDE desktop environment; applications written for any of these environments can be run simultaneously.

xclock

Along with reference implementation of X protocol, the X.org Foundation hosts development of several utilities and example applications, including xcalc on-screen calculator, xclock simple digital and analog clock, xedit text editor, xload periodically updated histogram of the average system load, xterm terminal emulator, and xeyes which shows, by default, a pair of eyes that follow the mouse cursor.

As of April 2013, the Board of Directors consisted of Alan Coopersmith, Alex Deucher, Martin Peres, Matt Dew, Matthias Hopf, Peter Hutterer (Secretary), Stuart Kreitman (Treasurer), and Keith Packard.

== X.Org Developer's Conference ==
The physical meeting is the X.Org Developer's Conference (XDC/XDS), which is organized once a year, around September/October and alternates between North America and Europe and lasts for 3 days. The board of directors can cover the travel and accommodation expenses to the developers who couldn't attend an X.Org-related conference (XDC or FOSDEM?) otherwise.

=== Conference history ===
Event and year	Date	Host city	Venue	Resources	Themes
XDC2004	28–30 April	Cambridge, Massachusetts, USA	Cambridge Research Laboratory		
XDC2005	12–14 February	Cambridge, Massachusetts, USA	Cambridge Research Laboratory		X.Org Server, Cairo, xephyr
XDC2006	8–10 February	Santa Clara, California, USA	Sun Microsystems campus		Xgl
XDC2007	7–9 February	Menlo Park, California, USA	TechShop Menlo Park facility		
XDS2007	10–12 September	Cambridge, United Kingdom	Clare College		
XDC2008	16–18 April	Mountain View, California, USA	Google campus		
XDS2008	3–5 September	Edinburgh, United Kingdom	Edinburgh Zoo		XKB, MPX
XDC2009	28–30 September	Portland, Oregon, USA	University Place Hotel, Portland State University		
XDS2010	16–18 September	Toulouse, France	Toulouse 1 University Capitole		
XDC2011	12–14 September	Chicago, Illinois, USA	McCormick Tribune Campus Center		
XDC2012	19–21 September	Nuremberg, Germany	SUSE campus		
XDC2013	23–25 September	Portland, Oregon, USA	University Place Hotel, Portland State University		DRM, DRI3, XCB, nouveau, etc.
XDC2014	8–10 October	Bordeaux, France	Laboratoire Bordelais de Recherche en Informatique (LaBRI)		Wayland, Tizen, FreeBSD, DragonflyBSD, Mesa 3D, etc.
XDC2015	16–18 September	Toronto, Canada	Seneca@York campus, Seneca College		GLSL compiler, Nouveau, libinput, Freedreno, Etnaviv, amdgpu, drm, etc.
XDC2016	20–22 September	Helsinki, Finland	Haaga-Helia University of Applied Sciences		
XDC2017	20–22 September	Mountain View, California, USA	Google Bldg 1055		
XDC2018	26–28 September	A Coruña, Galicia, Spain	Computer Science Faculty of University of A Coruña		
XDC2019	2–4 October	Montreal, Canada	Concordia University Conference Centre		
XDC2020	16–18 September	Virtual	Virtual		
XDC2021	15–17 September	Virtual	Virtual		
XDC2022	4–6 October	Minneapolis, Minnesota, USA	University of St. Thomas		
XDC2023	17–19 October	A Coruña, Galicia, Spain	PALEXCO		
XDC2024	9–11 October	Montréal, Canada	Concordia University Conference Center		
XDC2025	29 September – 1 October	Vienna, Austria	TU Wien		
XDC2026	28–30 September	Toronto, Canada	Daniels Spectrum		

== X.Org Endless Vacation of Code (EVoC) ==
X.Org Endless Vacation of Code (EVoC) is a Google Summer of Code (GSoC)-like project initiated in 2008 funded by the X.Org Foundation. It allows students to participate to X.Org-related projects during their vacation, at any time of the year.

An example of an accepted EVoC project from 2014 is to work on nouveau, the free and open-source graphics device driver for GeForce-branded GPUs. NVA3/5/8 are the engineering names of the Tesla-based GT215, GT216 and GT218.

== See also ==
- Free and open-source graphics device driver
- List of free-software events
