= Diodon (software) =

Clipboard manager for GNOME

- Original author: Oliver Sauder
- Developer: Oliver Sauder
- Stable release: 1.12.0 / 2022-01-05
- Written in: Vala
- Operating system: Linux
- Platform: Linux
- Available in: Multilingual
- Type: Clipboard manager
- License: GNU GPL v2
- Website: launchpad.net/diodon
- Repository: github.com/diodon-dev/diodon

Diodon is a clipboard manager for GNOME/GTK+ with application indicator support.

The application provides Unity indicator applet support and also Unity Dash support. The developers updated the logos and added new experimental Zeitgeist integration in 2012.
