= Xft =

- Original author: Keith Packard
- Stable release: 2.3.9 / 20 April 2025; 13 months ago
- Type: Software library
- License: MIT/X license (The Open Group)
- Website: freedesktop.org/wiki/Software/Xft
- Repository: gitlab.freedesktop.org/xorg/lib/libxft

Xft, the X FreeType interface library, is a free computer program library written by Keith Packard.

It is designed to allow the FreeType font rasterizer to be used with the X Rendering Extension; it is generally employed to use FreeType's anti-aliased fonts with the X Window System. Xft also depends on fontconfig for access to the system fonts.
