= Xinit =

xinit
- Stable release: 1.4.4 / 9 March 2025; 16 months ago
- Written in: C
- Website: xinit manual page
- Repository: gitlab.freedesktop.org/xorg/app/xinit.git

The xinit program allows a user to manually start an X display server. The startx script is a front-end for xinit.

By default, xinit and startx start an X display server pointing to a display device that is enumerated as :0 and then start an xterm on it. When the xterm terminates, xinit and startx kill the X display server. In general, xinit and startx can start an arbitrary server and run an arbitrary script. Typically, this script runs a number of programs and a window manager.

Two alternative methods for starting an X display server are by using a display manager and by starting the X server and then manually starting one or more clients. On desktop Linux systems, a display manager is the most commonly used method.
