= Klipper =

Clipboard manager for the KDE interface

- Developer: KDE
- Repository: invent.kde.org/plasma/plasma-workspace/-/tree/master/klipper
- Website: userbase.kde.org/Klipper

Klipper is a clipboard manager for the KDE interface. It allows users of Unix-like operating systems running the KDE desktop environment to access a history of Wayland and X Selections, any item of which can be reselected for pasting. It can also be used to perform an action automatically if certain text is selected (e.g. opening a URL in a browser).
