= Exa (command-line utility) =

Command-line utility for listing files

exa
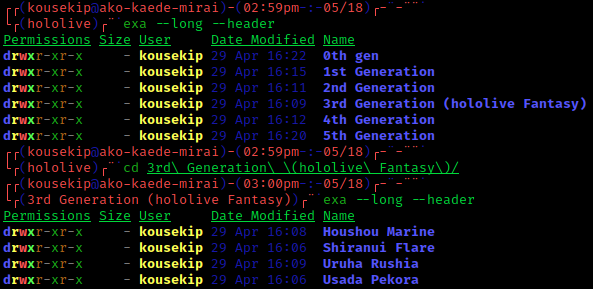
- Original author: Benjamin Sago
- Initial release: May 22, 2014; 11 years ago
- Stable release: 0.10.1 / 12 April 2021
- Repository: github.com/ogham/exa
- Written in: Rust
- Platform: Linux, macOS
- License: MIT License
- Website: the.exa.website

exa is a (currently unmaintained -- see below) command-line utility for listing files. It is promoted as "a modern replacement for ls" with features not present in ls, such as showing git status. exa is one of the first applications written in Rust to be included in Fedora, openSUSE, and Gentoo.

In September 2023, its maintainer redirected people to the fork eza instead, after its original author became unreachable.
