= Glipper =

Clipboard utility software

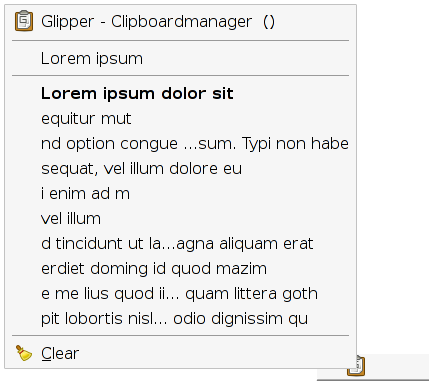
- A screenshot of Glipper 0.95.1
- Stable release: 2.4 / August 15, 2012; 13 years ago
- Written in: Python
- Operating system: BSD, Linux
- Platform: GNOME
- Available in: English, German, Italian
- License: GNU GPL v2
- Website: launchpad.net/glipper

Glipper is a clipboard utility for the GNOME Panel. It allows users of Unix-like operating systems to access a history of X Selections, any item of which can be reselected for pasting. Glipper is often described as the GNOME counterpart to KDE's Klipper. Older versions of Glipper could also be run outside of GNOME, but the newest version 1.0 is GNOME only because of its heavy integration into different GNOME techniques. However, it can be run inside Xfce4's panel using the XfApplet wrapper - and through it, into any custom session that uses xfce4-panel, such as Openbox sessions.

== Plugin support ==
Since version 1.0, Glipper also supports plugins, which can be written in Python. Some plugin are also included in the 1.0 release:

- A network plugin, to synchronize the histories of multiple Glipper processes via the network
- An action plugin, similar to Klipper's action function
- A snippet plugin, which lets the user access text snippets they want to use very frequently
- A nopaste plugin, which lets you paste your clipboard content to a Nopaste service
