= Window manager =

Type of system software

Layers of the graphical user interface: Under X, the window manager and the display server are two distinct programs; but under Wayland, the function of both is handled by the Wayland compositor.

Typical elements of a window. The window decoration is either drawn by the window manager or by the client. The drawing of the content is the task of the client.

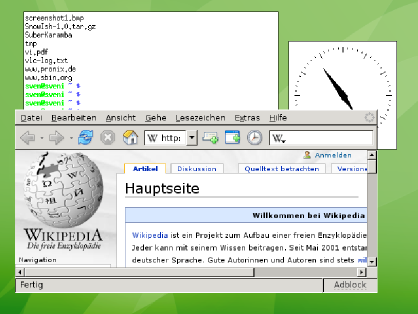
Under X11, when no window manager is running, the window decorations are missing.

A window manager is system software that controls the placement and appearance of windows within a windowing system in a graphical user interface. Most window managers are designed to help provide a desktop environment. They work in conjunction with the underlying graphical system that provides required functionality—support for graphics hardware, pointing devices, and a keyboard—and are often written and created using a widget toolkit.

Few window managers are designed with a clear distinction between the windowing system and the window manager. Every graphical user interface based on a windows metaphor has some form of window management. In practice, the elements of this functionality vary greatly. Elements usually associated with window managers allow the user to open, close, minimize, maximize, move, resize, and keep track of running windows, including window decorators. Many window managers also come with various utilities and features such as task bars, program launchers, docks to facilitate halving or quartering windows on screen, workspaces for grouping windows, desktop icons, wallpaper, an ability to keep select windows in foreground, the ability to "roll up" windows to show only their title bars, to cascade windows, to stack windows into a grid, to group windows of the same program in the task bar in order to save space, and optional multi-row taskbars.

== History ==
In 1973, the Xerox Alto became the first computer shipped with a working WIMP GUI. It used a stacking window manager that allowed overlapping windows. However, this was so far ahead of its time that its design paradigm would not become widely adopted until more than a decade later. While it is unclear if Microsoft Windows contains designs copied from Apple's classic Mac OS, it is clear that neither was the first to produce a GUI using stacking windows. In the early 1980s, the Xerox Star, successor to the Alto, used tiling for most main application windows, and used overlapping only for dialogue boxes, removing most of the need for stacking.

The classic Mac OS was one of the earliest commercially successful examples of a GUI that used a sort of stacking window management via QuickDraw. Its successor, macOS, uses a somewhat more advanced window manager that has supported compositing since Mac OS X 10.0, and was updated in Mac OS X 10.2 to support hardware accelerated compositing via the Quartz Compositor.

GEM 1.1, from Digital Research, was a operating environment that included a stacking window manager, allowing all windows to overlap. It was released in the early 1980s. GEM is famous for having been included as the main GUI used on the Atari ST, which ran Atari TOS, and was also a popular GUI for MS-DOS prior to the widespread use of Microsoft Windows. As a result of a lawsuit by Apple, Digital Research was forced to remove the stacking capabilities in GEM 2.0, making its window manager a tiling window manager.

During the mid-1980s, Amiga OS contained an early example of a compositing window manager called Intuition (one of the low-level libraries of AmigaOS, which was present in Amiga system ROMs), capable of recognizing which windows or portions of them were covered, and which windows were in the foreground and fully visible, so it could draw only parts of the screen that required refresh. Additionally, Intuition supported compositing. Applications could first request a region of memory outside the current display region for use as bitmap. The Amiga windowing system would then use a series of bit blits using the system's hardware blitter to build a composite of these applications' bitmaps, along with buttons and sliders, in display memory, without requiring these applications to redraw any of their bitmaps.

In 1988, Presentation Manager became the default shell in OS/2, which, in its first version, only used a command line interface (CLI). IBM and Microsoft designed OS/2 as a successor to DOS and Windows for DOS. After the success of Windows 3.10, however, Microsoft abandoned the project in favor of Windows. After that, the Microsoft project for a future OS/2 version 3 became Windows NT, and IBM made a complete redesign of the shell of OS/2, substituting the Presentation Manager of OS/2 1.x for the object-oriented Workplace Shell that made its debut in OS/2 2.0.

== Examples ==
=== X window managers ===
On systems using the X Window System, there is a clear distinction between the window manager and the windowing system. Strictly speaking, an X window manager does not directly interact with video hardware, mice, or keyboards – that is the responsibility of the display server.

A desktop environment typically integrates a default window manager: for instance GNOME 2 uses Metacity, while KDE Plasma Workspaces uses KWin. But X Window System's modular design allows the user to switch to a different window manager: for instance Compiz (a 3D compositing manager) may be used if 3D effects are desired, while Sawfish and awesome instead offer exacting window control. Some components of different window managers can even be mixed and matched; for example, the window decorations from KWin can be used with the desktop and dock components of GNOME.

X window managers also have the ability to re-parent applications, meaning that, while initially all applications are adopted by the root window (essentially the whole screen), an application started within the root window can be adopted by (i.e., put inside of) another window. Window managers under the X window system adopt applications from the root window and re-parent them to apply window decorations (for example, adding a title bar). Re-parenting can also be used to add the contents of one window to another. For example, a flash player application can be re-parented to a browser window, and can appear to the user as supposedly being part of that program. Re-parenting window managers can therefore arrange one or more programs within the same window, and can easily combine tiling and stacking in various ways.

=== Microsoft Windows ===
Microsoft Windows has provided an integrated stacking window manager since Windows 2.0; Windows Vista introduced the compositing Desktop Window Manager (dwm.exe) as an optional hardware-accelerated alternative. In Windows, since GDI is part of the kernel, the role of the window manager is tightly coupled with the kernel's graphical subsystems and is largely non-replaceable, although third-party utilities can be used to simulate a tiling window manager on top of such systems. Window management on Windows can also be enhanced with third-party tools such as WindowBlinds and Resource Hacker. Since Windows 8, the Direct3D-based Desktop Window Manager can no longer be disabled. It can only be restarted with the hotkey combination Ctrl+Shift+Win+B.

Windows Explorer (explorer.exe) is used by default as the shell in modern Windows systems to provide a taskbar and file manager, along with many functions of a window manager; aspects of Windows can be modified through the provided configuration utilities, modifying the Windows Registry or with 3rd party tools, such as WindowBlinds or Resource Hacker.

A complete X Windows Server, allowing the use of window managers ported from the unixoid world can also be provided for Microsoft Windows through Cygwin/X even in multiwindow mode (and by other X Window System implementations). Thereby, it is easily possible to e.g. have X Window System client programs running either in the same Cygwin environment on the same machine, or on a Linux, BSD Unix etc. system via the network, and only their GUI being displayed and usable on top of the Microsoft Windows environment.

Note that Microsoft and X Window System use different terms to describe similar concepts. For example, there is rarely any mention of the term window manager by Microsoft because it is integrated and non-replaceable, and distinct from the shell. The Windows Shell is analogous to the desktop environment concept in other graphical user interface systems.

=== ChromeOS ===
Since 2021 ChromeOS is shipped with its own window manager called Ash. Chromium and ash share common codebase. In the past one could run it by using google-chrome --open-ash on any compatible systems.

== Types ==
Window managers are often divided into three or more classes, which describe how windows are drawn and updated.

=== Compositing window managers ===
Compositing window managers render each window independently before combining them into a unified display, enabling a wide range of two-dimensional and three-dimensional visual effects and allowing for significant flexibility in interface appearance.

=== Stacking window managers ===
All window managers that have overlapping windows and are not compositing window managers are stacking window managers, although it is possible that not all use the same methods. Stacking window managers allow windows to overlap by drawing background windows first, which is referred to as the painter's algorithm. Changes sometimes require that all windows be re-stacked or repainted, which usually involves redrawing every window. However, to bring a background window to the front usually only requires that one window be redrawn, since background windows may have bits of other windows painted over them, effectively erasing the areas that are covered.

=== Tiling window manager ===
Tiling window managers paint all windows on-screen by placing them side by side or above and below each other, so that no window ever covers another. Microsoft Windows 1.0 used tiling, and a variety of tiling window managers for X are available, such as i3, awesome, and dwm.

==== Dynamic window manager ====
Dynamic window managers can dynamically switch between tiling or floating window layout. A variety of dynamic window managers for X are available.

== Features and facilities of window managers ==
Autohide
An autohide facility enables menubars to disappear when the pointer is moved away from the edge of the screen.

Borders
A border is a window decoration component provided by some window managers, that appears around the active window. Some window managers may also display a border around background windows.

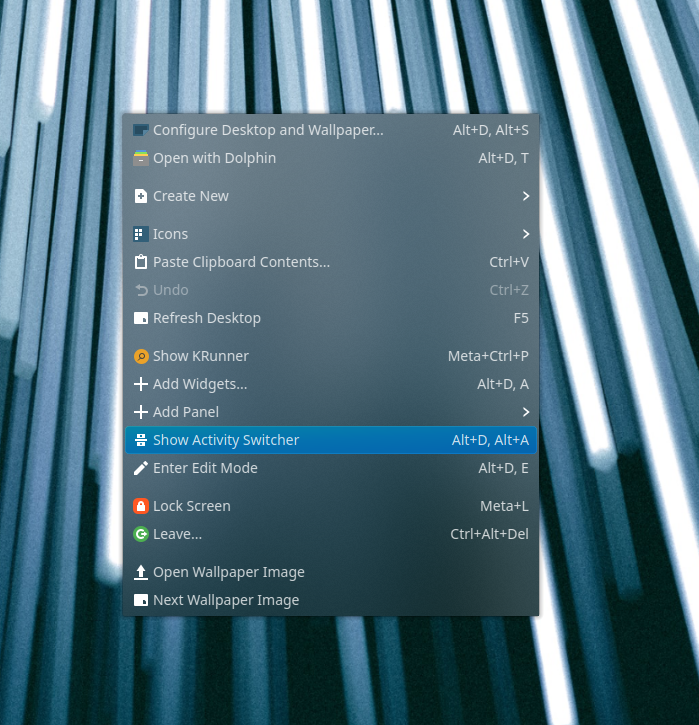
Example of a context menu

Context menu
Some window managers provide a context menu that appears when an alternative click event is applied to a desktop component.

Desktop wallpaper
Some window managers provide a desktop wallpaper facility that displays a background picture in the root window.

Focus stealing
Focus stealing is a facility some window managers provide. It allows an application not in focus to suddenly gain focus and steal user input intended for the previously focused application.

Iconification
An iconification facility lets users minimize running applications to a desktop icon or taskpanel icon.

Joined windows
Some window managers provide a joined windows facility that lets user join application window frames together.

Keyboard equivalents
Some window managers provide keyboard equivalents that enables the keyboard to replicate mouse functionality.

Menubar
A menubar provides the facility to launch programs via a menu and may contain additional facilities including a start button, a taskbar, and a system tray.

Menu panel
A menu panel a component of some window managers that provides the facility to launch programs using a menu. A menu panel is similar to a menubar, but appears as a floating panel, rather than a horizontal or vertical bar.
The menu panel may contain additional facilities including a start button, a task panel, and a system tray.

Mouse focus
The mouse focus model determines how the pointing device affects the input focus within the window manager. The focus model determine which component of the graphical user interface is currently selected to receive input as the pointer is moved around the screen.

Mouse warping
Mouse warping is a facility that centres the pointer on the current application as it is made active.

Multiple desktops
A window manager may provide a multiple desktops facility. This enables switching between several root window desktops. This prevents clutter of the root window, because applications can run on different desktops.

Pager
Some window managers provide a pager tool that provides the facility to switch between multiple desktops. The pager may appear as an onscreen window or as a gadget in the taskbar or taskpanel.

Plugins
Some window managers have a modular construction that enables plug-in modules to provide features as required.

Rollup
A rollup facility enables windows to appear as just a titlebar on the desktop.

Root Menu
Some window managers provide a root menu, which appears when the root window or desktop background is touched.

Shortcuts
Some window managers provide a shortcut facility that lets users place icons on the root window that access specific programs or facilities.

Tabbed windows
Some window managers provide a tabbed windows facility that groups applications together in common frames.

Task switching
The window manager may provide various task switching facilities that let the user change the currently focused application, including:
- Changing the mouse focus using a pointing device
- Keyboard task switching facilities (for example, by pressing Alt-Tab)
- Clicking on the task in a taskbar or taskpanel

Taskbar
Some window managers provide a taskbar that shows running applications. The taskbar may show all applications that are running including those that have been minimized, and may provide the facility to switch focus between them. The taskbar may be incorporated into a menubar on some window managers.

Task panel
A task panel is similar to a taskbar, but appears as a floating panel, rather than a horizontal or vertical bar.

Start button
A start button is a desktop widget that provides a menu of programs that can be launched. The start button is typically placed on a menubar at the bottom of the screen.

Notification area
A notification Area is used to display icons for system and program features that have no desktop window. It contains mainly icons to indicate status information and notifications such as arrival of a new mail message. Some systems may also show a clock in the Notification Area.

Title bars
A title bar is a window decoration component some window managers provide at the top of each window. The titlebar is typically used to display the name of the application, or the name of the open document, and may provide title bar buttons for minimizing, maximizing, closing or rolling up of application windows.

Title bar buttons
Title bar buttons are included in the title bar of some window managers, and provide the facility to minimize, maximize, rollup or close application windows. Some window managers may display the titlebar buttons in the taskbar or task panel, rather than in a titlebar.

Virtual desktop
A virtual desktop (also called a scrolling desktop) is a facility some window managers provided that lets the desktop be larger than the actual screen

=== Windows navigation ===
An active window is the currently focused window in the current window manager. Different window managers indicate the currently-active window in different ways and allow the user to switch between windows in different ways. For example, in Microsoft Windows, if both Notepad and Microsoft Paint are open, clicking in the Notepad window will cause that window to become active. In Windows, the active window is indicated by having a different colored title bar. Clicking is not the only way of selecting an active window, however: some window managers (such as FVWM) make the window under the mouse pointer active—simply moving the mouse is sufficient to switch windows; a click is not needed.

Window managers often provide a way to select the active window using the keyboard as an alternative to the mouse. One typical key combination is Alt+Tab, used by Windows and KDE (by default, though this is user-configurable); another is apple key-tilde, used by Macintosh. Pressing the appropriate key combination typically cycles through all visible windows in some order, though other actions are possible.

Many, though not all, window managers provide a region of the screen containing some kind of visual control (often a button) for each window on the screen. Each button typically contains the title of the window and may also contain an icon. This area of the screen generally provides some kind of visual indication of which window is active—for example, the active window's button may appear “pushed in”. It is also usually possible to switch the active window by clicking on the appropriate button. In Microsoft Windows, this area of the screen is called the taskbar; in Apple Macintosh systems this area of the screen is called the dock.

The active window may not always lie in front of all other windows on the screen. The active window is simply the window to which keys typed on the keyboard are sent; it may be visually obscured by other windows. This is especially true in window managers which do not require a click to change active windows: FVWM, for example, makes active the window under the mouse cursor but does not change its Z-order (the order in which windows appear, measured from background to foreground). Instead, it is necessary to click on the border of the window to bring it to the foreground. There are also situations in click-to-focus window managers such as Microsoft Windows where the active window may be obscured; however, this is much less common.

== See also ==
- Operating environment
- Comparison of X window managers
