= KDE Projects =

Open source projects

- Developer: KDE
- Written in: C++, Qt, QML and many more
- Operating system: Unix-like with X11 or Wayland, Windows, Android, MacOS
- Type: Free Software
- License: GNU GPL, GNU LGPL, BSD License, MIT License
- Website: invent.kde.org

KDE Projects are projects maintained by the KDE community, a group of people developing and advocating free software for everyday use, for example KDE Plasma and KDE Frameworks or applications such as Amarok, Krita or Digikam. There are also non-coding projects like designing the Breeze desktop theme and iconset, which is coordinated by KDE's Visual Design Group. Even non-Qt applications like GCompris, which started as a GTK-based application, or web-based projects like WikiToLearn are officially part of KDE.

KDE uses Konqi, a dragon as their mascot.

== Overview ==
As of today there are many KDE projects that are either stand-alone or grouped into larger sub-projects:

- KDE Plasma Workspaces
- KDE Frameworks (formerly KDE-Libs): A collection of libraries that provides frameworks and functionality for developers
- KDE Applications Bundle: Containing core applications like Konqueror, Dolphin, KWrite, and Konsole.

=== KDE Core projects ===
- Plasma – UI for multiple workspaces
- KWin – Window manager
- KHTML – HTML rendering engine, forked into WebKit in 2004
- KJS – JavaScript engine
- KIO – Extensible network-transparent file access
- KParts – Lightweight in-process graphical component framework
- XMLGUI – Allows defining UI elements, such as menus and toolbars via XML files
- Phonon – Multimedia framework
- Solid – Device integration framework
- Sonnet – Spell checker
- ThreadWeaver – Library to use multiprocessor systems more effectively

=== KDE Applications ===
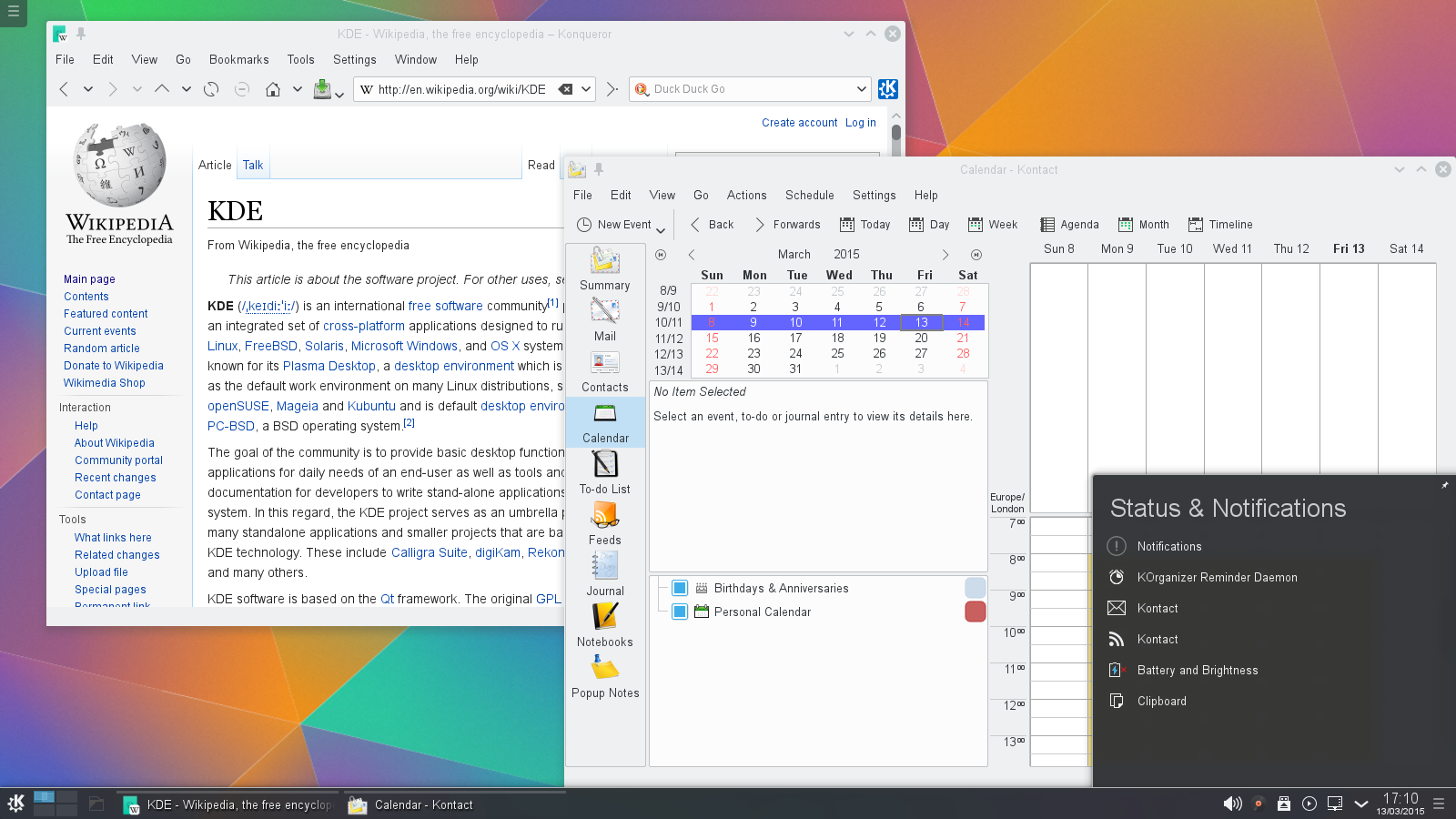
The Kontact personal information manager and Konqueror file manager/web browser running on KDE Plasma 5.2

Major applications developed by KDE include:

- Ark – Archiving tool
- Dragon Player – Media player.
- Dolphin – File manager
- Gwenview – Image viewer
- Kate – Text editor
- Konsole – Terminal emulator
- Kontact – Personal information manager featuring an e-mail client, a news client, a feed aggregator, to-do lists, etc.
- Konqueror – Web browser and file manager
- Kopete – Instant messaging client
- Krita – Raster graphics editor for digital painting
- Kdenlive – Video editing software

=== Thematically related groups of applications ===
- KDE-Plasma-Addons: Additional Plasma widgets.
- KDE-Network
- KDE-Pim
- KDE-Graphics
- KDE-Multimedia
- KDE-Accessibility: Accessibility applications.
- KDE-Utilities
- KDE-Edu
- Calligra Suite: Integrated office suite
- KDE-Games
- KDE-Toys
- KDE-Artwork: Additional icons, styles, etc.
- KDE-SDK
- KDE-Bindings
- KDEWebdev: Web development tools.
- KDE-Extragear: Extragear is a collection of applications and tools that are not part of the core KDE Applications.
- KDE-Playground: This repository contains new and unstable software. It is a place for applications to mature.

=== Other projects ===
- KDE Connect: A multi-platform application that allows data transfer between devices over local networks.
- KDE neon: a distro featuring the latest KDE software packages on top of an Ubuntu base.
- Wiki2Learn: a wiki-based web framework for people to participate and share knowledge.
- Liquidshell: an alternative to Plasma

== Development ==
=== Source code ===
The source code of every KDE project is stored in a source code repository using Git. Stable versions are released to the KDE FTP server in the form of source code with configure scripts, ready to be compiled by operating system vendors and to be integrated with the rest of their systems before distribution. Most vendors use only stable and tested versions of KDE programs or applications, providing it in the form of easily installable, pre-compiled packages.

=== Implementation ===
Most KDE projects are using the Qt framework, which runs on most Unix and Unix-like systems (including Mac OS X), and Microsoft Windows. As of 2011 CMake serves as the build tool. This allows KDE to support a wider range of platforms, including Windows. GNU gettext is used for translation. Doxygen is used to generate api documentation.

=== Licensing ===
KDE software projects must be released under free licensing terms. In November 1998, the Qt framework was dual-licensed under the free and open-source Q Public License (QPL) and a commercial license for proprietary software developers. The same year, the KDE Free Qt foundation was created which guarantees that Qt would fall under a variant of the very liberal BSD license should Trolltech cease to exist or no free version of Qt be released during 12 months.

Debate continued about compatibility with the GNU General Public License (GPL), hence in September 2000 Trolltech made the Unix version of the Qt libraries available under the GPL in addition to the QPL which eliminated the concerns of the Free Software Foundation. Trolltech continued to require licenses for developing proprietary software with Qt. The core libraries of KDE are collectively licensed under the GNU LGPL but the only way for proprietary software to make use of them was to be developed under the terms of the Qt proprietary license.

Starting with Qt 4.5, Qt was also made available under the LGPL version 2.1, now allowing proprietary applications to legally use the open source Qt version.

== See also ==
- List of KDE applications
- KDE Applications
- KDE Extragear
