= KDE Platform 4 =

Collection of software libraries and frameworks

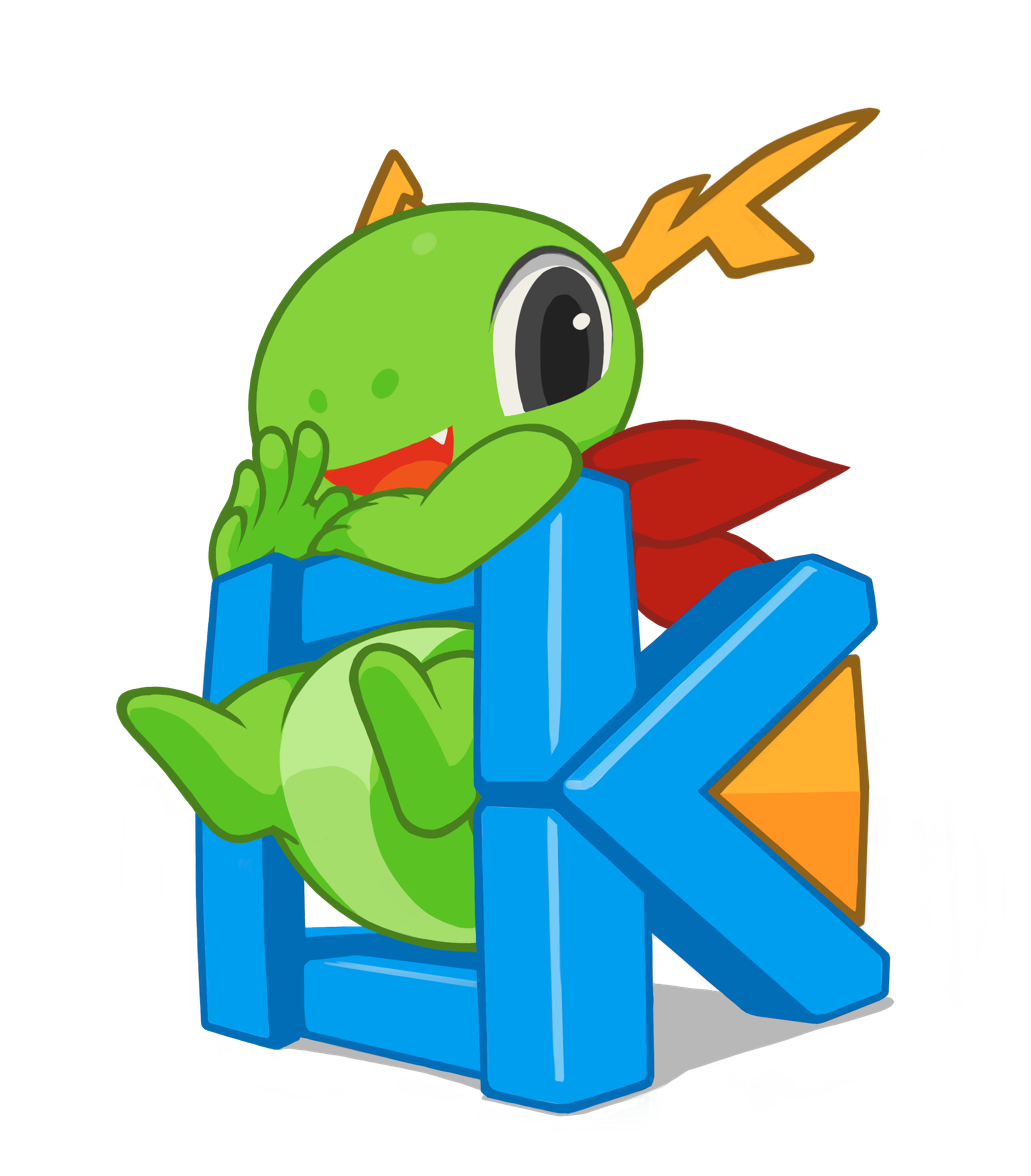
- Original author: KDE
- Developer: KDE
- Initial release: 11 January 2008; 18 years ago
- Final release: 4.14.12 (September 15, 2015; 10 years ago) [±]
- Written in: C++
- Type: System libraries; Software frameworks
- License: GNU Lesser General Public License (LGPL)
- Repository: invent.kde.org/unmaintained/kdelibs

KDE Platform 4 is a collection of libraries and software frameworks by KDE that serves as technological foundation for KDE Software Compilation 4 distributed under the GNU Lesser General Public License (LGPL). KDE Platform 4 is the successor to KDElibs and the predecessor of KDE Frameworks.

KDE Software Compilation structure

== Technologies ==
- User Interface
  - Plasma – desktop and panel widget engine
  - KHTML – HTML rendering engine
  - KIO – extensible network-transparent file access
  - KParts – lightweight in-process graphical component framework
  - Sonnet – spell checker
  - KXMLGUI – allows defining UI elements such as menus and toolbars via XML files
  - Goya
- Hardware and Multimedia
  - Phonon – multimedia framework
  - Solid – device integration framework
- Services
  - NEPOMUK
  - KNewStuff – KDE's "Hot New Stuff" classes
  - Policykit-KDE
- Communication
  - Akonadi
- Games
  - Gluon
  - KGGZ
- Other
  - ThreadWeaver – library to use multiprocessor systems more effectively
  - Kiosk – allows disabling features within KDE to create a more controlled environment
  - Kross
  - KConfig XT
  - WebDAV

=== Technologies superseded in KDE Platform 4 ===
- aRts – sound server (replaced with Phonon)
- DCOP – inter-process communication system (replaced with D-Bus)

== KParts ==
KParts is the component framework for the KDE Plasma desktop environment. An individual component is called a KPart. KParts are analogous to Bonobo components in GNOME and ActiveX controls in Microsoft's Component Object Model. Konsole is available as a KPart and is used in applications like Konqueror and Kate.

Example uses of KParts:

- Konqueror uses the Okular part to display documents
- Konqueror uses the Dragon Player part to play multimedia
- Kontact embeds kdepim applications
- Kate and other editors use the katepart editor component
- Several applications use the Konsole KPart to embed a terminal

== Solid ==
Solid is a device integration framework for KDE Platform 4 and its successor, KDE Frameworks. It functions on similar principles to KDE's multimedia pillar Phonon; rather than managing hardware on its own, it makes existing solutions accessible through a single API. The current solution uses udev, NetworkManager and BlueZ (the official Linux Bluetooth stack). However, any and all parts can be replaced without breaking the application, making applications using Solid extremely flexible and portable. Work is underway to build a Solid backend for the Windows port of KDE based on Windows Management Instrumentation.
