= KDE (disambiguation) =

KDE is a free software development community.

KDE may refer to:

== Computing ==
- KDE e.V., legal entity behind KDE
- KDE Projects, various software
  - KDE Software Compilation, a desktop environment (once KDE)
    - KDE Plasma, its graphical shells

== Entertainment ==
- 4Kids Entertainment, a bankrupt TV production company (NYSE:KDE)
- Konami Digital Entertainment, a video game developer

== Other uses ==
- Kentucky Department of Education, United States
- Kernel density estimation, in statistics
- Makonde language, spoken in Tanzania and Mozambique (ISO 639-3:kde)
