= Dragon Player =

Media player software

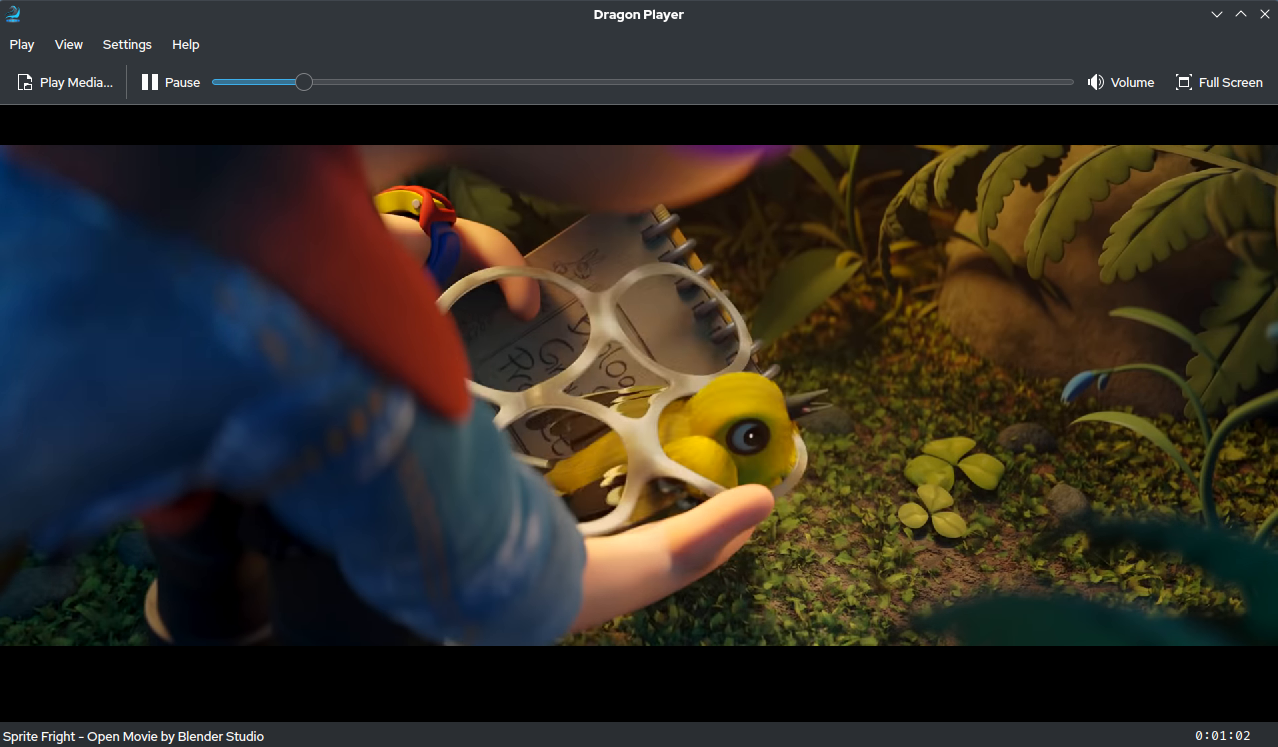
- Developer: Ian Monroe
- Written in: C++ (Qt)
- Operating system: Cross-platform
- Platform: KDE Frameworks 5
- Type: Media player
- License: GNU General Public License
- Website: KDE.org application website
- Repository: invent.kde.org/multimedia/dragon

Dragon Player is a simple media player for the KDE desktop environment. It is the renamed continuation of a video player for KDE 3 called Codeine, which was originally created and developed by Max Howell, and is now developed by Ian Monroe under the new name for KDE SC 4. Because Dragon Player makes use of Phonon—a multimedia API that itself connects to any of several multimedia frameworks—it will play anything the particular connected multimedia framework supports. It was the default video player in the KDE 4 version of Kubuntu from 8.04 to 14.10.

== Features ==
- Simple interface
- Resuming videos
- Support for subtitles
- Video display settings (brightness, contrast)
- Due to using Solid and Phonon, Dragon Player is independent of any multimedia framework or hardware abstraction layer(can be a very important detail).
- Supports playing CDs and DVDs
