= KDevelop =

Integrated development environment

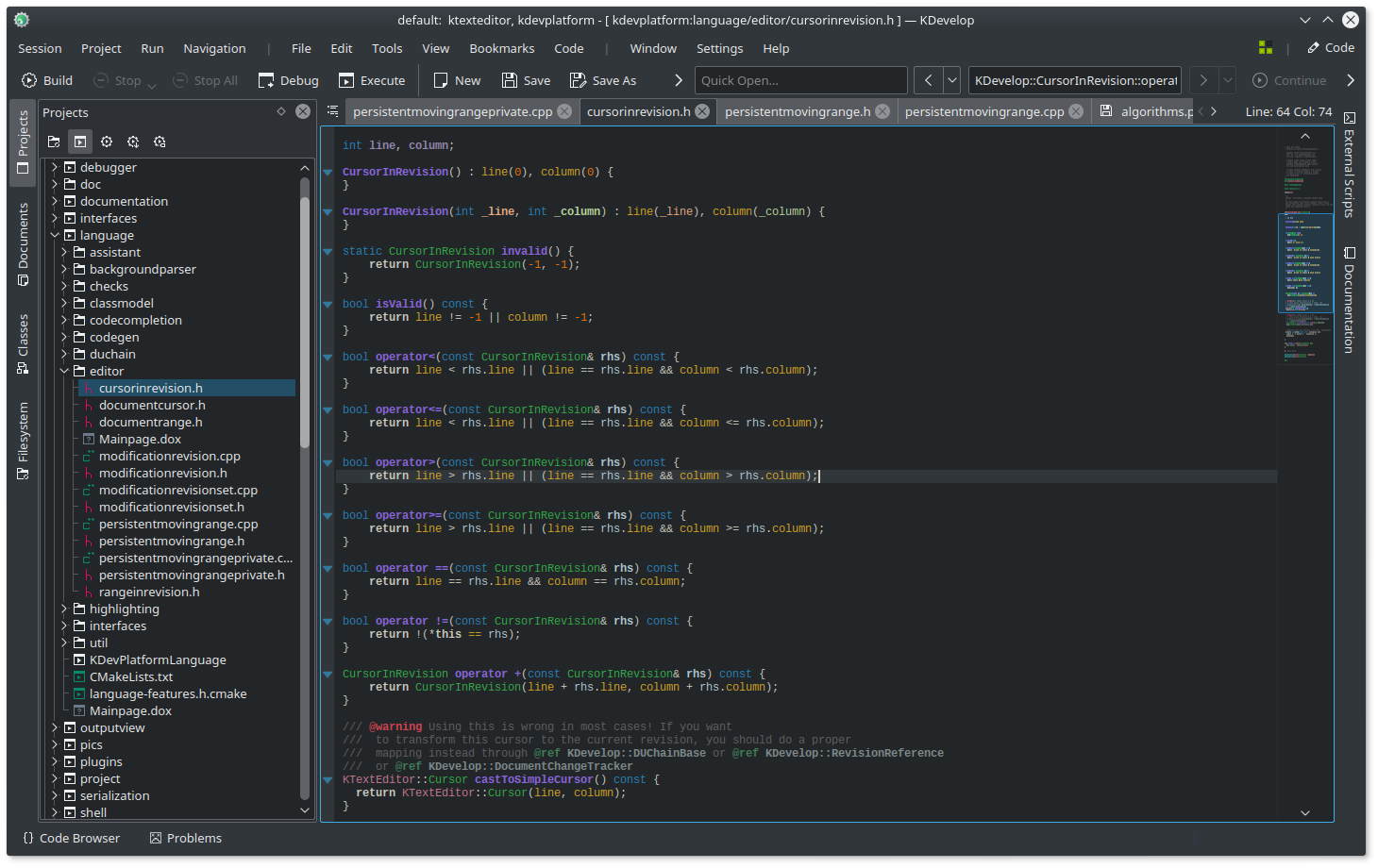
- Developer: KDE
- Initial release: December 6, 1999; 26 years ago
- Stable release: 6.3.250800 / 14 August 2025; 8 months ago
- Written in: C, C++
- Operating system: Linux, Windows, macOS (preview, no official pre-built installer)
- Type: Integrated development environment
- License: GPL-2.0-or-later
- Website: www.kdevelop.org
- Repository: invent.kde.org/kdevelop/kdevelop

KDevelop is a free and open-source integrated development environment (IDE) for Unix-like computer operating systems and Windows. It provides editing, navigation and debugging features for several programming languages, and integration with build automation and version-control systems, using a plugin-based architecture.

KDevelop 5 has parser backends for C, C++, Objective-C, OpenCL and JavaScript/QML, with plugins supporting PHP, Python 3 and Ruby. Basic syntax highlighting and code folding are available for dozens of other source-code and markup formats, but without semantic analysis.

KDevelop is part of the KDE project, and is based on KDE Frameworks and Qt. The C/C++ backend uses Clang to provide accurate information even for very complex codebases.

== History ==
KDevelop 0.1 was released in 1998, with 1.0 following in late 1999. 1.x and 2.x were developed over a period of four years from the original codebase.

It is believed that Sandy Meier originated KDevelop. Ralf Nolden is also known to be an early developer of the project. In 1998 Sandy Meier started KDevelop and worked 8 weeks alone on this project. Since then, the KDevelop IDE is publicly available under the GPL and supports many programming languages.

Bernd Gehrmann started a complete rewrite and announced KDevelop 3.x in March 2001. Its first release was together with K Desktop Environment 3.2 in February 2004, and development of KDevelop 3.x continued until 2008.

KDevelop 4.x, another complete rewrite with a more object-oriented programming model, was developed from August 2005 and released as KDevelop 4.0.0 in May 2010. The last feature update of this branch was version 4.7.0 in September 2014, with bugfix releases continuing until KDevelop 4.7.4 in December 2016

KDevelop 5 development began in August 2014 as a continuation of the 4.x codebase, ported to Qt5 and KDE Frameworks 5. The custom C++ parser used in earlier versions, which had poor support for C++11 syntax, was replaced by a new Clang-based backend. The integrated CMakeFile interpreter was also removed in favour of JSON metadata produced by the upstream CMake tool.

Semantic language support was added for QML and JavaScript, using the parser from Qt Creator, alongside a new QMake project-manager backend.

The first stable 5.x release was KDevelop 5.0.0 in August 2016. In October 2016, official Microsoft Windows builds were released for the first time.

== Features ==
KDevelop uses an embedded text editor component through the KParts framework. The default editor is KDE Advanced Text Editor, which can optionally be replaced with a Qt Designer-based editor. This list focuses on the features of KDevelop itself. For features specific to the editor component, see the article on Kate.

- Source code editor with syntax highlighting and automatic indentation (Kate).
- C/C++ language is now supported with a Clang's backend (as of KDevelop-5.0)
- Project management for different project types, such as Automake, CMake, qmake for Qt based projects and Ant for Java based projects.
- Class browser.
- GUI designer
- Front-end for the GNU Compiler Collection and GNU Debugger.
- Wizards to generate and update class definitions and application framework.
- Automatic code completion (C/C++).
- Built-in Doxygen support.
- Revision control (also known as SCM) support. Supported systems include CVS, Subversion, Perforce, ClearCase, Git, Mercurial, and Bazaar

KDevelop 4 is a completely plugin-based architecture. When a developer makes a change, they only must compile the plugin. There is a possibility to keep several profiles each of which determines which plugins to be loaded. KDevelop does not come with a text editor, but instead uses a plugin for this purpose as well. KDevelop is programming language independent and build system-independent, supporting KDE, GNOME, and many other technologies such as Qt, GTK+, and wxWidgets.

KDevelop has supported a variety of programming languages, including C, C++, Python, PHP, Java, Fortran, Ruby, Ada, Pascal, SQL, and Bash scripting. Supported build systems include GNU (automake), cmake, qmake, and make for custom projects (KDevelop does not destroy user Makefiles if they are used) and scripting projects which don't need one.

Code completion is available for C and C++. Symbols are kept in a Berkeley DB file for quick lookups without re-parsing. KDevelop also offers a developer framework which helps to write new parsers for other programming languages.

An integrated debugger allows graphically doing all debugging with breakpoints and backtraces. It even works with dynamically loaded plugins unlike command line GDB.

Quick Open allows quick navigation between files.

Currently, around 50 to 100 plugins exist for this IDE. Major ones include persistent project-wide code bookmarks, Code abbreviations which allow expanding text quickly, a Source formatter which reformats code to a style guide before saving, Regular expressions search, and project-wide search/replace which helps in refactoring code.

== See also ==
- Comparison of integrated development environments
- List of integrated development environments
- List of KDE applications
- Qt Creator
