= Konsole =

Terminal emulator

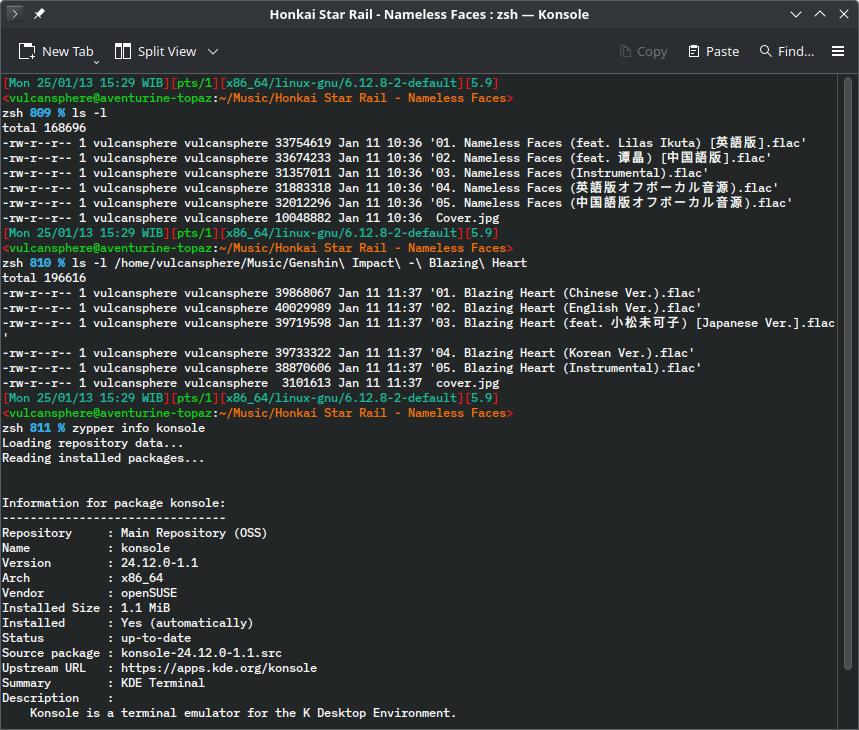
- Screenshot of Konsole in KDE Plasma 6
- Developers: Lars Doelle, Robert Knight
- Stable release: 24.12.1 / 5 January 2025
- Written in: C++ (KDE Frameworks, Qt)
- Type: Terminal emulator
- License: GPL-2.0-or-later
- Website: apps.kde.org/konsole/
- Repository: invent.kde.org/utilities/konsole

Konsole is a free and open-source terminal emulator graphical application which is part of KDE Applications and ships with the KDE desktop environment. Konsole was originally written by Lars Doelle. It ls licensed under the GPL-2.0-or-later and the GNU Free Documentation License.

KDE applications, including Dolphin, Kate, KDevelop, Kile, Konversation, Konqueror, and Krusader, use Konsole to provide embedded terminal functionality via Kpart.

== Features ==
- Built-in support for bi-directional text display.
- Tabbed terminals. Tab titles update dynamically depending on the current activity in the terminal.
- Translucent backgrounds
- Split-view mode
- Directory and SSH bookmarking
- Customizable color schemes
- Customizable key bindings
- Notifications about silence or activity in a terminal
- Incremental search
- Can open Dolphin or the user's preferred file manager at the terminal program's current directory
- Export of output in plain text or HTML format
- Multiple profile support
- Text reflow

== Internals ==
Up to the KDE 4.0, Konsole internal functionality was split into a backend and frontend parts. The backend was represented by a terminal emulator (the DEC VT102 + xterm emulation program) and the frontend that included terminal display and user interface used to display output characters on a window screen or a printer.

With newer versions Konsole on Linux systems uses PTY (pseudoterminal interface) abstraction implemented by KPty KDE framework introduced in 2014.

== Gallery ==
Konsole split-view modes

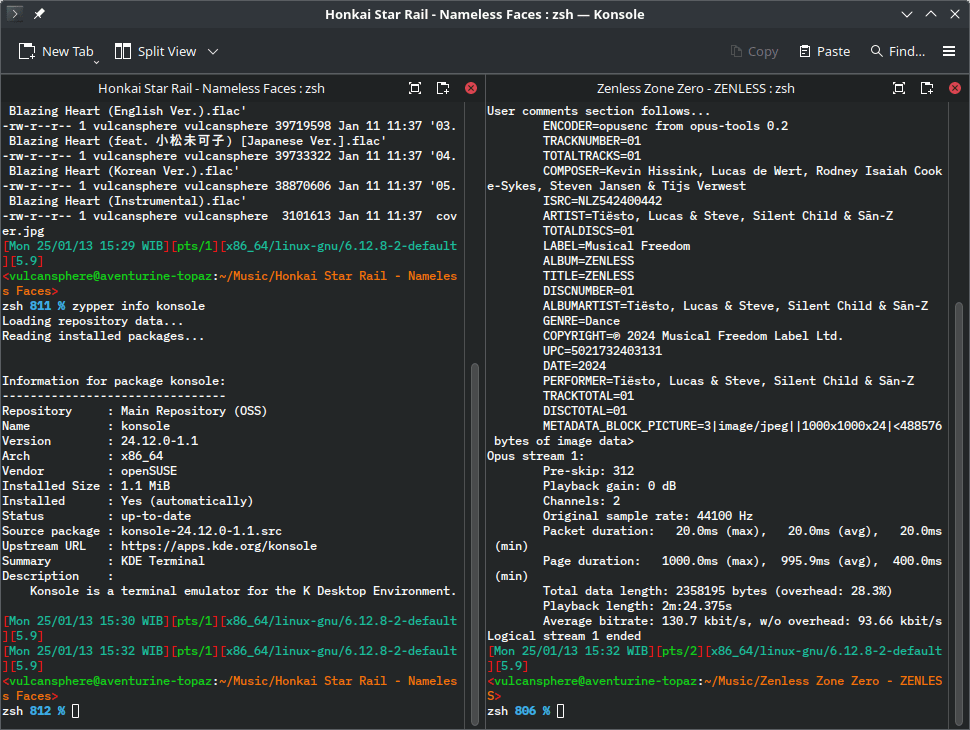
Left-to-right

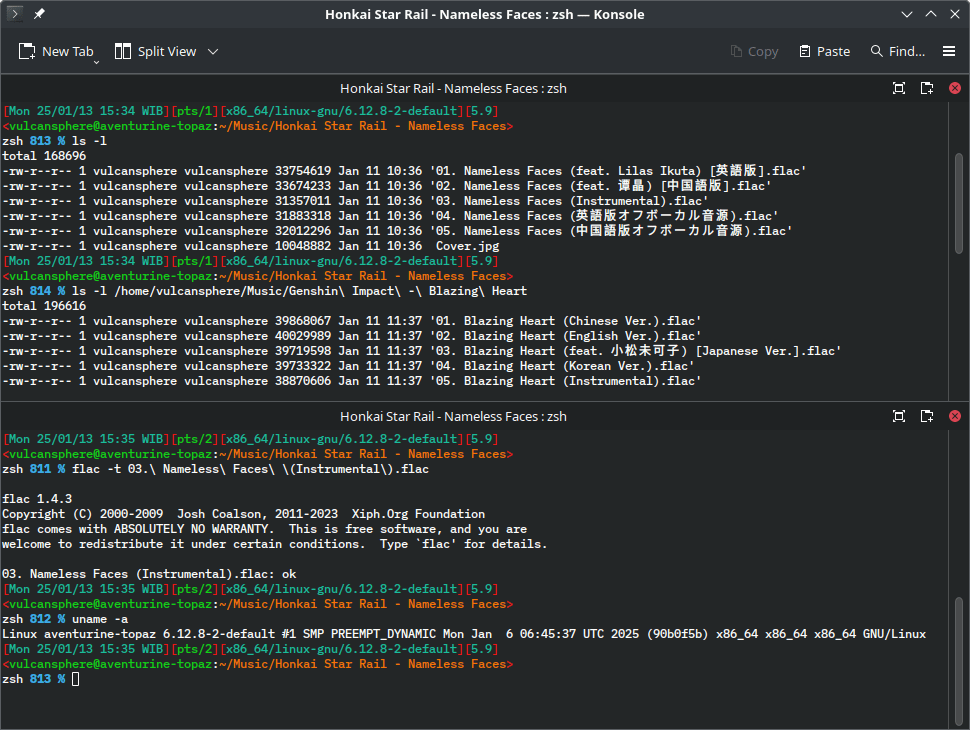
Top-to-bottom

== See also ==
- List of terminal emulators
- KDE Plasma 5
- KDE neon
- KDE Frameworks
- Bash (Unix shell)
