= Sonnet (software) =

Multilingual spell checker

- Original author: KDE
- Developer: KDE
- Stable release: 6.25.0 / 10 April 2026; 28 days ago
- Type: Spell checker
- Website: api.kde.org/sonnet-index.html
- Repository: invent.kde.org/frameworks/sonnet

Sonnet is a multilingual spell checker program in KDE Frameworks. Sonnet replaced kspell2 from KDE3 in KDE Software Compilation 4. The two main goals for Sonnet's development were a simpler API, wider language support and performance. Notable improvements in Sonnet over kspell2 are:

- In automatic language detection, a language can be identified with as little as 20 characters of text. Even multiple languages in the same document can be detected and spell checked correctly
- Better performance
- Improvements in spell checking languages like Thai and Japanese
- A simpler design - kspell2 consisted of 7 components and a complicated API. Sonnet is a single component and aims to provide a simpler API
- The user can select a primary and backup dictionary, an example given was a doctor who frequently uses terms from a medical dictionary. Words that would not appear in a regular dictionary would be corrected by the backup dictionary that contains medical terms.

== See also ==
- Enchant (software)
