= KHTML =

Discontinued open source browser engine

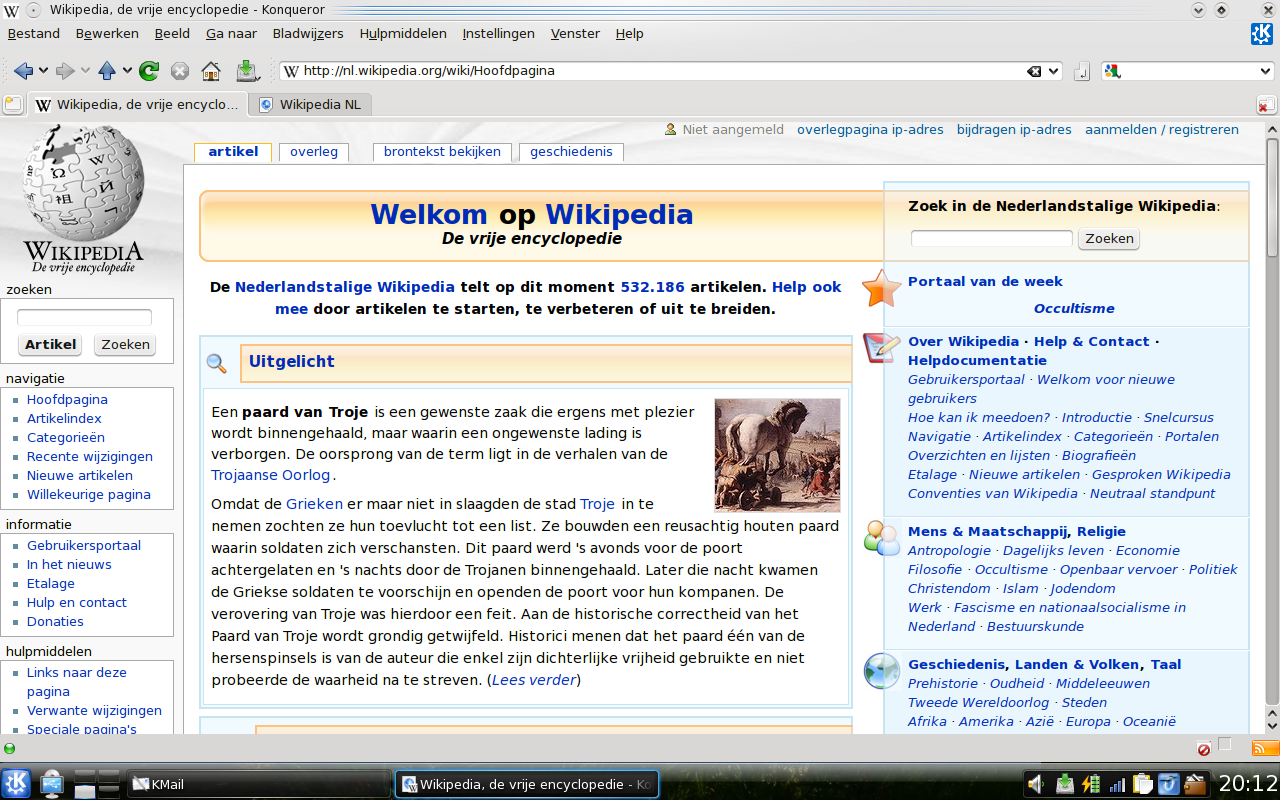
- Konqueror using KHTML to render the Dutch Wikipedia front page in 2009
- Developer: KDE
- Final release: 5.116.0 (May 4, 2024; 2 years ago) [±]
- Written in: C++
- Type: Browser engine
- License: GNU Lesser General Public License
- Repository: invent.kde.org/frameworks/khtml

KHTML is a discontinued browser engine that was developed by the KDE project. It originated as the engine of the Konqueror browser in the late 1990s. Its development has been ceased in 2016 and it was officially discontinued in 2023.

Built on the KParts framework and written in C++, KHTML had relatively good support for Web standards during its prime. Engines that are forked from KHTML are used by most of the browsers that are widely used today, including WebKit (Safari) and Blink (Google Chrome, Chromium, Microsoft Edge, Opera, Vivaldi and Brave).

== History ==
=== Origins ===
KHTML was preceded by an earlier engine called khtmlw or the KDE HTML Widget, developed by Torben Weis and Martin Jones, which implemented support for HTML 3.2, HTTP 1.0, and HTML frames, but not the DOM, CSS, or JavaScript.

KHTML itself came into existence on November 4, 1998, as a fork of the khtmlw library, with some slight refactoring and the addition of Unicode support and changes to support the move to Qt 2. Waldo Bastian was among those who did the work of creating that early version of KHTML.

=== Re-write and improvement ===
The real work on KHTML actually started between May and October 1999, with the realization that the choice facing the project was "either do a significant effort to move KHTML forward or to use Mozilla" and with adding support for JavaScript as the highest priority. So in May 1999, Lars Knoll began doing research with an eye toward implementing the DOM specification, finally announcing on August 16, 1999 that he had checked in what amounted to a complete rewrite of the KHTML library—changing KHTML to use the standard DOM as its internal document representation. That in turn allowed the beginnings of JavaScript support to be added in October 1999, followed shortly afterwards with the integration of KJS by Harri Porten.

In the closing months of 1999 and first few months of 2000, Knoll did further work with Antti Koivisto and Dirk Mueller to add CSS support and to refine and stabilize the KHTML architecture, with most of that work being completed by March 2000. Among other things, those changes enabled KHTML to become the second browser after Internet Explorer to correctly support Hebrew and Arabic and languages written right-to-left—before Mozilla had such support.

KDE 2.0 was the first KDE release (on October 23, 2000) to include KHTML (as the rendering engine of the new Konqueror file and web browser, which replaced the monolithic KDE File Manager).

=== Other modules ===
KSVG was first developed in 2001 by Nikolas Zimmermann and Rob Buis. However, by 2003, it was decided to fork the then-current KSVG implementation into two new projects: KDOM/KSVG2 (to improve the state of DOM rendering in KHTML underneath a more formidable SVG 1.0 render state) and Kcanvas (to abstract any rendering done within KHTML/KSVG2 in a single shared library, with multiple backends for it, e.g., Cairo/Qt, etc.).

KSVG2 is also a part of WebKit.

=== Sunsetting ===
KHTML was scheduled to be removed in KDE Frameworks 6. Active development ended in 2016, just the necessary maintenance to work with updates to Frameworks 5. It was officially discontinued in 2023.

== Standards compliance ==
The following standards are supported by the KHTML engine:

- HTML 4.01
- HTML 5 support
- CSS 1
- CSS 2.1 (screen and paged media)
- CSS 3 Selectors (fully as of KDE 3.5.6)
- CSS 3 Other (multiple backgrounds, box-sizing and text-shadow)
- PNG, MNG, JPEG, GIF graphic formats
- DOM 1, 2 and partially 3
- ECMA-262/JavaScript 1.5
- Partial Scalable Vector Graphics support

== Descendants ==
KHTML and KJS were adopted by Apple in 2002 for use in the Safari web browser. Apple publishes the source code for their fork of the KHTML engine, called WebKit. In 2013, Google began development on a fork of WebKit, called Blink, which is now widely used in the most popular browsers such as Google Chrome, Microsoft Edge, Opera, Vivaldi, Brave and more.

== See also ==
- List of web browsers § KHTML-based
- Comparison of browser engines
