= Kate (text editor) =

Text editor

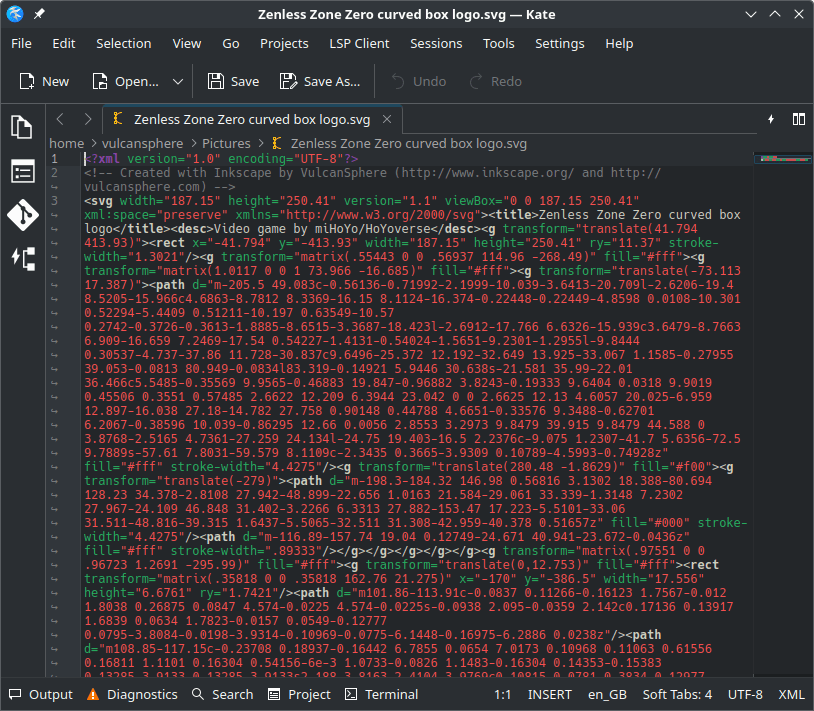
- Kate 24.12.0 in KDE Plasma 6
- Developer: KDE
- Release: 2001; 25 years ago
- Stable release: 25.12.2 / 1 February 2026
- Written in: C++, Qt
- Operating system: 25 Linux distributions; Microsoft Windows; macOS
- Type: Source code editor
- License: LGPL-2.0-or-later, MIT
- Website: kate-editor.org
- Repository: invent.kde.org/utilities/kate

The KDE Advanced Text Editor, or Kate, is a source code editor developed by the KDE free software community. It has been a part of KDE Software Compilation since version 2.2, which was first released in 2001. Intended for software developers, it features syntax highlighting, code folding, customizable layouts, multiple cursors and selections, regular expression support, and extensibility via plugins.

== History ==
Kate has been part of the KDE Software Compilation since release 2.2 in 2001. Because of KParts technology, it is possible to embed Kate as an editing component in other KDE applications. Major KDE applications which use Kate as an editing component include the integrated development environment KDevelop, the web development environment Quanta Plus, and the LaTeX front-end Kile.

Kate has won the advanced text editor comparison in Linux Voice magazine.

In 2014, development started to port Kate, along with Dolphin, Konsole, KDE Telepathy, and Yakuake, to KDE Frameworks 5.

In 2022, the KDE text-editor KWrite was modified to use the same code base as Kate with deactivated features.

In February 2024, as part of the KDE Gear 24.02 release, Kate was ported to KDE Frameworks 6 and Qt 6.

== Features ==
Kate is a source code editor that features syntax highlighting for over 300 file formats with code folding rules. The syntax highlighting is extensible via XML files. It supports UTF-8, UTF-16, ISO-8859-1 and ASCII encoding schemes and can detect a file's character encoding automatically. Kate offers code completion and reference finding for various programming languages through its Language Server Protocol Client plugin. The default configuration supports C, C++, D, Fortran, Go, Latex, Python, Rust, and OCaml.

Kate's main text editor widget is called KatePart, which is reusable under the terms of the LGPL version 2 license. It must not be confused with the KParts, a KDE plugin framework for user interface components that Kate also uses.

Kate can be used as a modal text editor through its vi input mode.

Kate features multiple document interface, window splitting, project editing and sessions to facilitate editing multiple documents. Using sessions, one can customize Kate for different projects by saving the list of open files, the list of enabled plug-ins and the window configuration.

Kate includes the KDE terminal emulator Konsole through its Terminal Tool View plugin. Since version 23.04, the terminal is also available on Windows.

The "quick open" feature allows searching opened files by name for quick recalling. Line modification indicators highlight lines with unsaved changes and lines added in the current session.

Being a KDE application, Kate transparently opens and saves files over all protocols supported by KIO libraries. This includes HTTP, FTP, SSH, SMB and WebDAV, among others.

Kate is equipped with a session manager which allows naming, saving, and restoring sessions, meaning a list of momentarily open file tabs. Saved sessions are stored as key-value-formatted *.katesession files into ~/.local/share/kate/sessions/.

Other features are a clipboard history with up to ten items, the ability to jump to a line number, and source control integration using Git.

== See also ==
- List of KDE applications
- List of text editors
- Comparison of text editors
- List of computing mascots
- Computing mascots
