= ThreadWeaver =

Computer library

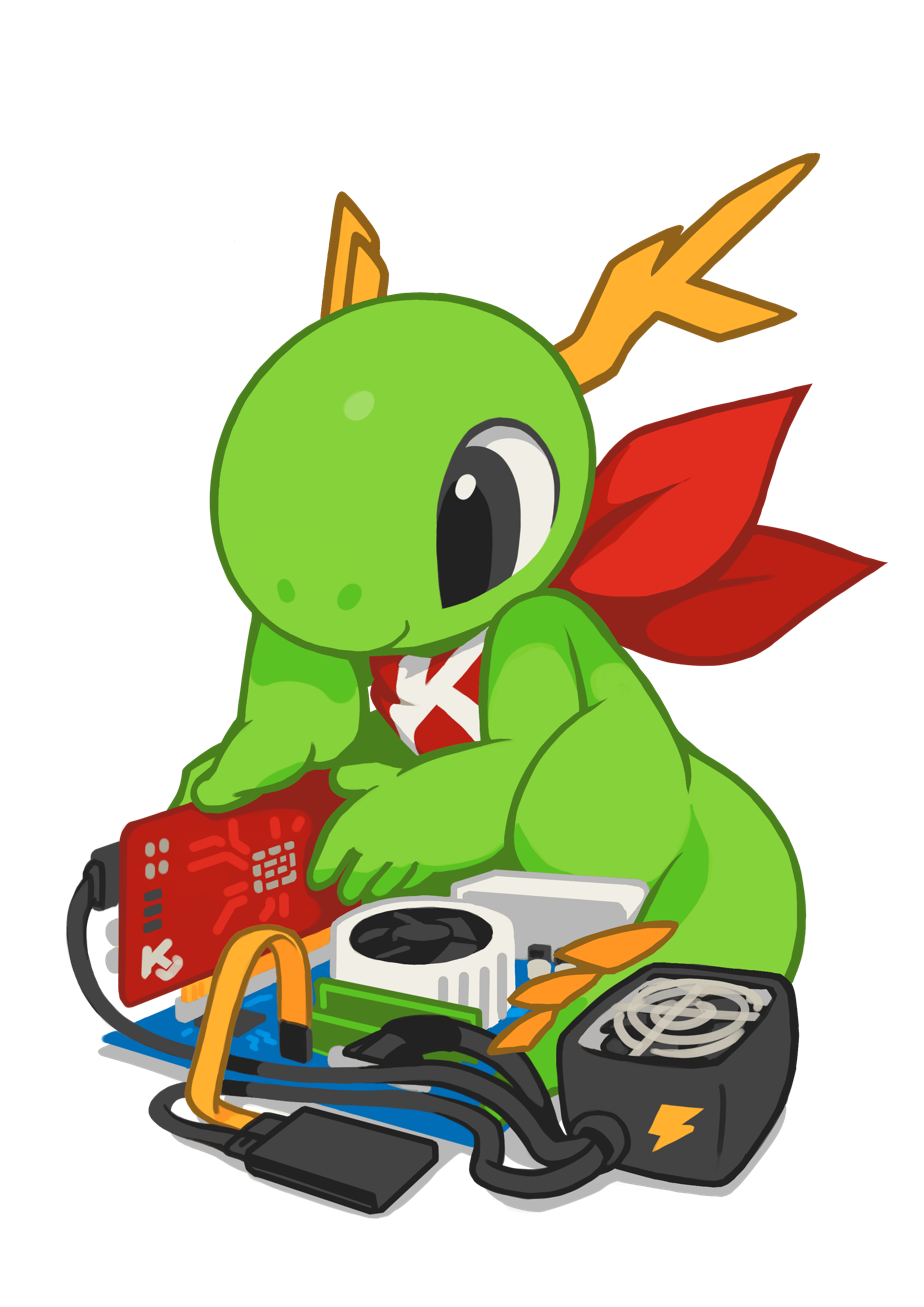
- Original author: Mirko Boehm
- Developer: Mirko Boehm
- Stable release: 6.27.0 / 11 June 2026; 24 days ago
- Operating system: Linux, other Unix and Unix-like systems, Windows
- Type: System library multithreaded library
- License: LGPL
- Website: api.kde.org/frameworks-api/frameworks5-apidocs/threadweaver/html/index.html
- Repository: invent.kde.org/frameworks/threadweaver

ThreadWeaver is a system library initially developed for KDE Software Compilation 4 and later refactored for KDE Frameworks 5.

ThreadWeaver allows developers to easily take advantage of multi-core processors and multithreading. In ThreadWeaver the workload is divided into individual jobs, then relationship between jobs (what order they should be completed or which has a higher priority); from that ThreadWeaver will work out the most efficient way to execute them. Krita has implemented visual filter previews using ThreadWeaver to prevent GUI lockups.
