= Konqueror =

Web browser and file manager

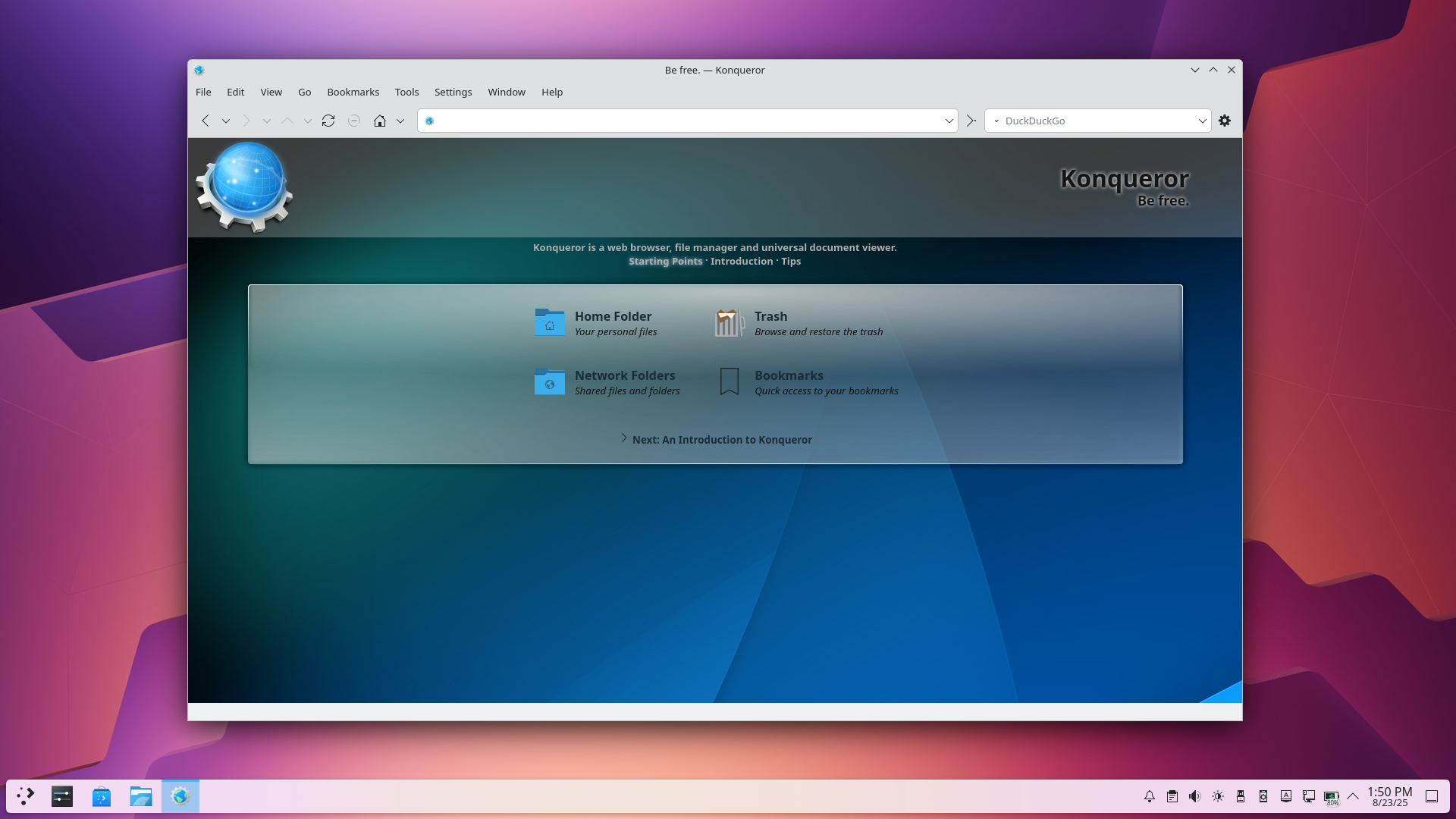
- Konqueror 25.04.0 showing the default homepage
- Developer: KDE
- Initial release: 23 October 2000; 25 years ago
- Stable release: 25.08.0 / 7 August 2025; 9 months ago
- Written in: C++ (Qt)
- Engines: WebKit, KHTML, Qt WebEngine (Chromium)
- Operating system: Unix-like
- Type: Web browser, file browser
- License: GPL-2.0-or-later
- Website: apps.kde.org/konqueror/
- Repository: invent.kde.org/network/konqueror

Konqueror is a free and open-source web browser and file manager that provides web access and file-viewer functionality for file systems (such as local files, files on a remote FTP server and files in a disk image). It forms a core part of the KDE Software Compilation. Developed by volunteers, Konqueror can run on most Unix-like operating systems. The KDE community licenses and distributes Konqueror under GNU GPL-2.0-or-later.

The name "Konqueror" references the two primary competitors at the time of the browser's first release: "first comes the Navigator, then Explorer, and then the Konqueror". It also follows the KDE naming convention: the names of most KDE programs begin with the letter K.

Konqueror first appeared with version 2 of KDE on October 23, 2000. It replaced its predecessor, KFM (KDE file manager). With the release of KDE 4 in 2008, the functionalities of web browser and file manager were separated: Dolphin replaced Konqueror as the default KDE file manager, while the KDE community continues to maintain Konqueror as the default KDE web browser.

== Major supported protocols ==
Konqueror can utilize all KIO Workers installed on the user's system. Some examples include:

- FTP and SFTP/SSH browser
- Samba (Microsoft file-sharing) browser
- HTTP browser
- IMAP mail client
- ISO (CD image) viewer
- VNC viewer

A complete list is available in the KDE Info Center's Protocols section.

== User interface ==
Konqueror supports tabbed document interface and Split views, wherein a window can contain multiple documents in tabs. Multiple document interfaces are not supported, however it is possible to recursively divide a window to view multiple documents simultaneously, or simply open another window.

Konqueror's user interface is somewhat reminiscent of Microsoft's Internet Explorer, though it is more customizable. It works extensively with "panels", which can be rearranged or added. For example, one could have an Internet bookmarks panel on the left side of the browser window, and by clicking a bookmark, the respective web page would be viewed in the larger panel to the right. Alternatively, one could display a hierarchical list of folders in one panel and the content of the selected folder in another. Panels are quite flexible and can even include, among other KParts (components), a console window, a text editor, and a media player. Panel configurations can be saved, and there are some default configurations. (For example, "Midnight Commander" displays a screen split into two panels, where each one contains a folder, Web site, or file view.)

Navigation functions (back, forward, history, etc.) are available during all operations. Most keyboard shortcuts can be remapped using a graphical configuration, and navigation can be conducted through an assignment of letters to nodes on the active file by pressing the control key. The address bar has extensive autocompletion support for local directories, past URLs, and past search terms.

== Web browser ==
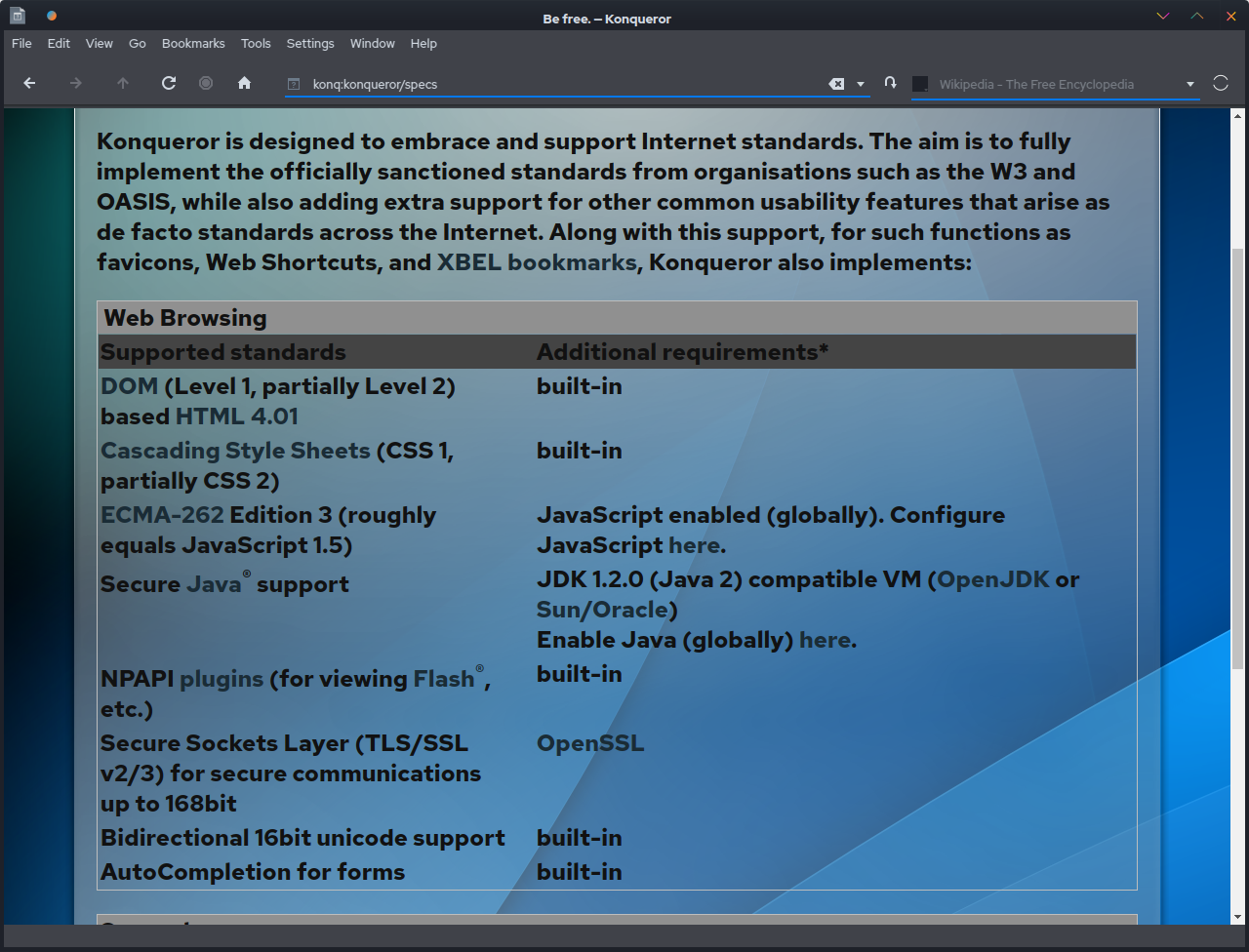
Konqueror specifications

Konqueror has been developed as an autonomous web browser project. It currently uses Qt WebEngine as its browser engine.

Konqueror integrates several customizable search services which can be accessed by entering the service's abbreviation code (for example, gg: for Google, or wp: for Wikipedia) followed by the search terms. One can add their own search service; for instance, to retrieve English Wikipedia articles, a shortcut may be added with the URL http://en.wikipedia.org/wiki/Special:Search?search=\{@}&go=Go.

Konqueror spawned the KHTML engine browser engine, which was compliant with HTML and supported JavaScript, CSS, SSL, and other relevant open standards. KHTML's rendering speed was on par with that of competing browsers, but sites with customized JavaScript were often problematic due to KHTML's much smaller mind- and market-share, resulting in fewer features being built into the JavaScript engine.

KJS was Konqueror's JavaScript engine that was originally developed by Harri Porten in 2000. KHTML and KJS were forked by Apple to develop the WebKit engine and the JavaScriptCore framework.

Active development of KHTML and KJS ended after the release of KDE 4.2 in 2009. The following year, QtWebKit (a port of WebKit to the Qt framework), was integrated into the browser, relying on the KWebKitPart component to make use of it. However, the KHTML rendering backend contained unique features, such as the ability to save a full archive of any given webpage into a single file with the ".war" extension.

Maintenance of QtWebKit 2.x, which Konqueror depended on, ended in 2014. In 2016, the browser was ported to KDE Frameworks 5 and now uses the Chromium-based QtWebEngine framework for page rendering.

== File manager ==
Konqueror also allows browsing the local directory hierarchy—either by entering locations in the address bar, or by selecting items in the file browser window. It allows browsing in different views, which differ in their usage of icons and layout. Files can also be executed, viewed, copied, moved, and deleted.

The user can also open an embedded version of Konsole, via KDE's KParts technology, in which they can directly execute shell commands. In addition to the Konsole KPart, Konqueror can also use a Filelight KPart, to view a radial diagram of the user's filesystem.

Although this functionality has not been removed from Konqueror, as of KDE 4, Dolphin has replaced Konqueror as the default file manager. Dolphin can – like Konqueror – divide each window or tab into multiple panes. Konqueror makes more powerful use of this feature, allowing as many vertically and horizontally divided panes as desired. Each can link to different content or even remote locations, so that Konqueror becomes a powerful graphical tool to manage content on multiple servers all in one window, "dragging and dropping" files between locations.

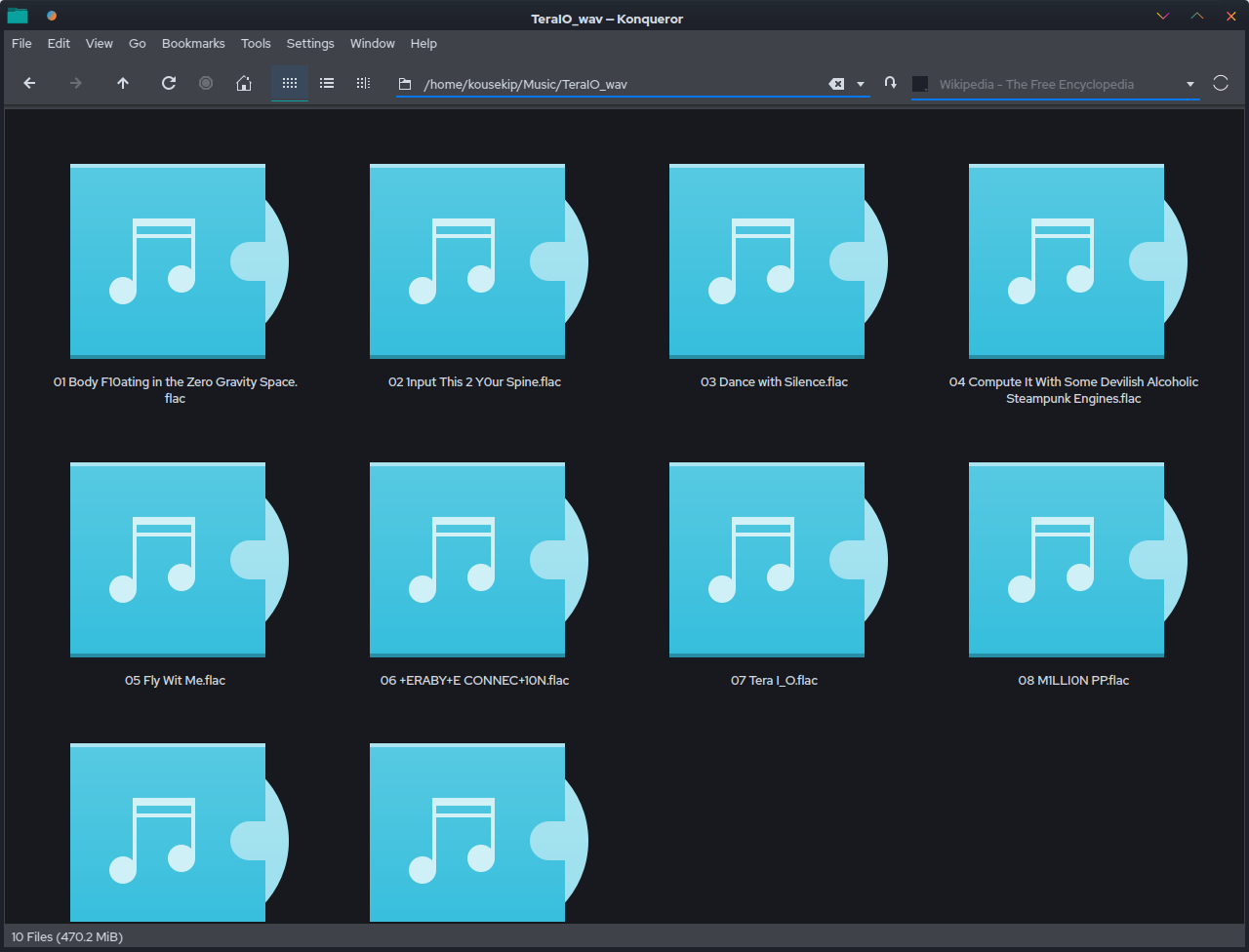
Konqueror's file manager

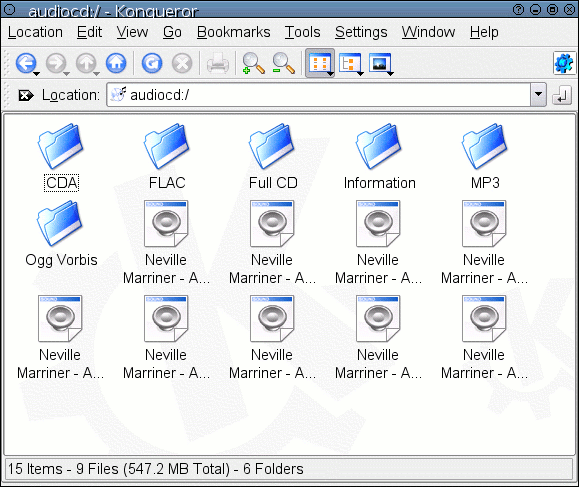
Konqueror displaying the contents of an audio CD

== File viewer ==
Using the KParts object model, Konqueror executes components that are capable of viewing (and sometimes editing) specific filetypes and embeds their client area directly into the Konqueror panel in which the respective files have been opened. This makes it possible to, for example, view an OpenDocument (via Calligra) or PDF document directly within Konqueror. Any application that implements the KParts model correctly can be embedded in this fashion.

KParts can also be used to embed certain types of multimedia content into HTML pages; for example, the KMPlayer KPart enables Konqueror to show embedded video on web pages.

== KIO ==
In addition to browsing files and websites, Konqueror utilizes KIO plugins to extend its capabilities well beyond those of other browsers and file managers. It uses components of KIO, the KDE I/O plugin system, to access different protocols such as HTTP and FTP (support for these is built-in), WebDAV, SMB (Windows shares), SFTP and FISH (a handy replacement to the latter when the SFTP subsystem is disabled on the remote host).

Similarly, Konqueror can use KIO plugins (called IOslaves) to access ZIP files and other archives, to process ed2k links (edonkey/emule), or even to browse audio CDs, ("audiocd:/") and rip them via drag-and-drop. Likewise, the "man:" and "info:" IOslaves can be used to fetch man and info formatted documentation.

== Konqueror Embedded ==
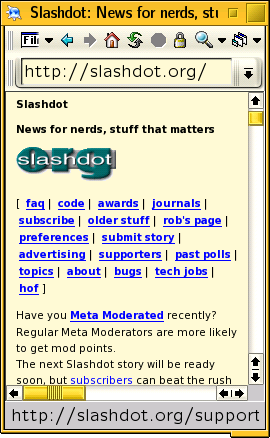
Konqueror Embedded on a Linux PDA

Konqueror Embedded, a version geared towards embedded systems, was previously available. Unlike the full version of Konqueror, Embedded Konqueror is purely a web browser. It does not require KDE or even the X window system. A single static library, it is designed to be as small as possible, while providing all necessary functions of a web browser, such as support for HTML 4, CSS, JavaScript, cookies, and SSL.

As of June 2019, this project's page on the KDE website has been taken down.

== Download manager ==
KGet

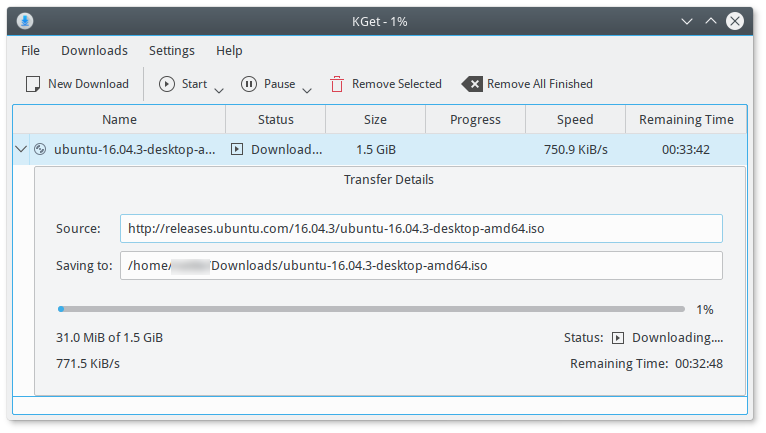
- KGet on KDE Plasma 5.10.5, showing an ongoing download
- Initial release: May 26, 2002; 23 years ago
- Stable release: 24.12.3 / 6 March 2025; 14 months ago
- Engine: WebKit; KHTML
- Type: Download manager
- License: GPL-2.0-or-later
- Website: apps.kde.org/en/kget
- Repository: invent.kde.org/network/kget

KGet is a free download manager for KDE and is the default download manager for Konqueror. It is part of the KDE Network package. By default, it is the download manager used for Konqueror, but can also be used with Mozilla Firefox and Chromium-based web browsers as well as rekonq. KGet was featured by Tux Magazine and Free Software Magazine.

=== History ===
On KDE 3, KGet 0.8.x, 1 supported HTTP/FTP download. On KDE Software Compilation 4, KGet 2 was released; it supported bandwidth throttling segmentation, multi-threading, and the BitTorrent protocol.

=== Features ===
- Downloading files from FTP, HTTP and BitTorrent sources.
- Pausing and resuming of downloading files, as well as the ability to restart a download.
- Gives information about current and pending downloads.
- Embedding into the system tray of the host system.
- Integration with the KDE Konqueror and Rekonq web browsers.
- Metalink support which contain multiple URLs for downloads, along with checksums and other information.
- Automatically tags downloaded files with download information (such as the download URL) using Nepomuk.
- Download from multiple servers to speed up download time (segmented file transfer).

== See also ==
- Comparison of file managers
- Comparison of web browsers
- Comparison of download managers
- KHTML
- KJS
- KSVG
- List of web browsers
- KIO
