= KIO =

System library

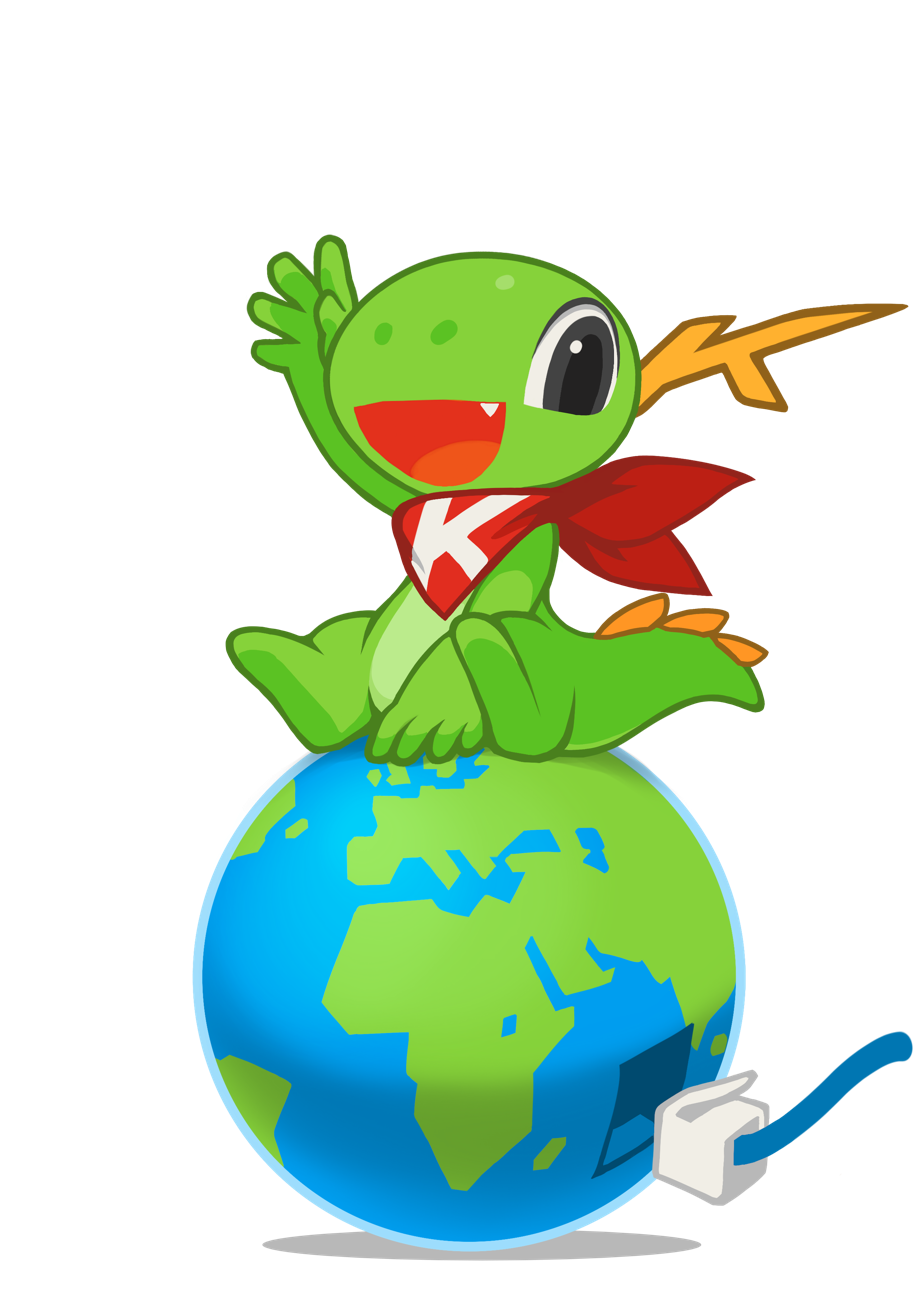
- Developer: KDE
- Stable release: 5.95.0 / 10 June 2022
- Preview release: 5.85.0-rc1 / 6 August 2021
- Written in: C++
- Type: System library
- Website: kde.org

As the GNU C Library serves as a wrapper for Linux kernel system calls, so does KIO serve as a further wrappers for its specific tasks.

KIO (KDE Input/Output) is a system library incorporated into KDE Frameworks and KDE Software Compilation 4. It provides access to files, web sites and other resources through a single consistent API. Applications, such as Konqueror and Dolphin, which are written using this framework, can operate on files stored on remote servers in exactly the same way as they operate on those stored locally, effectively making KDE network-transparent. This allows for an application like Konqueror to be both a file manager as well as a web browser.

KIO Workers (called KIO Slaves prior to KDE Frameworks 6) are libraries that provide support for individual protocols (e.g. WebDAV, FTP, SMB, SSH, FISH, SFTP, SVN, TAR).

The KDE manual app KHelpCenter has a KIOWorkers section that lists the available protocols with a short description of each.

== See also ==
- GIO and GVfs – provides equivalent functionality for GNOME, XFCE and Cinnamon
