= KDE =

Free software community

- K Desktop Environment
- Formation: 14 October 1996; 30 years ago
- Founder: Matthias Ettrich
- Type: Community
- Purpose: Free software
- Parent organization: KDE e.V.
- Website: kde.org

KDE is an international free software community that develops free software. As a central development hub, it provides tools and resources that enable collaborative work on its projects. Its products include the KDE Plasma graphical shell, KDE Frameworks, and the KDE Gear range of applications including Okular, Kdenlive and Krita. Many KDE applications are cross-platform and run on the platforms that Qt runs on, such as Linux, BSD, macOS and Windows. KDE is legally represented by KDE e.V. based in Germany, which also owns the KDE trademarks and funds the project.

== History ==
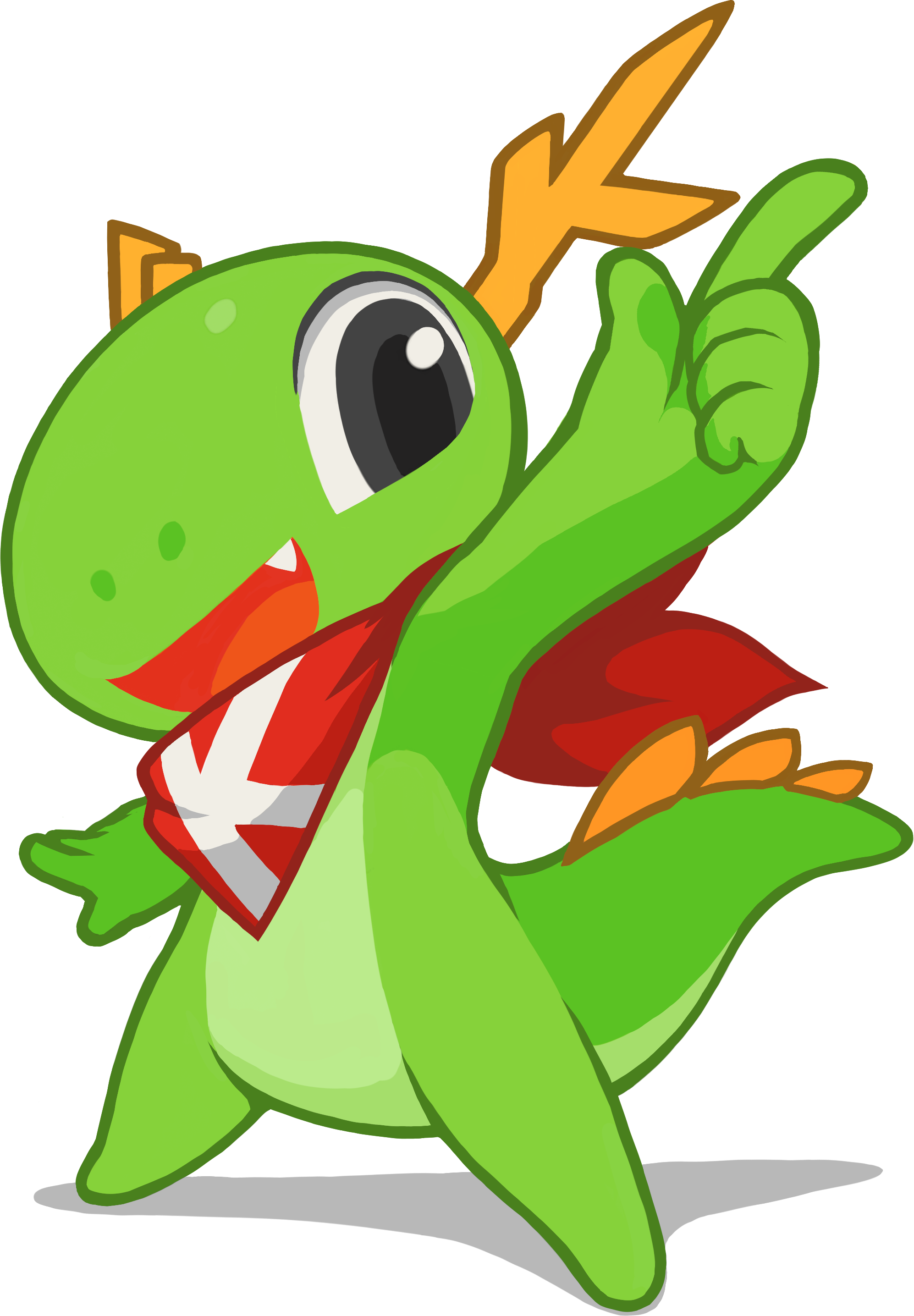
Konqi, the KDE mascot

KDE was founded in 1996 by Matthias Ettrich, a student at the University of Tübingen. At the time, he was troubled by certain aspects of the X11 desktop. Namely the "Xaw, Fvwm, XForms, Motif" and Tcl/tk toolkits. Among his concerns was that none of the applications looked or behaved alike. In his opinion, desktop applications of the time were too complicated for end users. In order to solve the issue, he proposed the creation of a desktop environment for Linux/X11 in which users could expect the applications to be consistent and easy to use. His initial Usenet post spurred significant interest, and the KDE project was born.

The name KDE was intended as a wordplay on the existing Common Desktop Environment, available for Unix systems. CDE was an X11-based user environment jointly developed by HP, IBM, USL, and SunSoft through the X/Open consortium, with an interface and productivity tools based on the Motif graphical widget toolkit. It was supposed to be an intuitively easy-to-use desktop computer environment. The K was originally suggested to stand for "Kool", but it was quickly decided that the K should stand for nothing in particular. Therefore, the KDE initialism expanded to "K Desktop Environment" before it was dropped altogether in favor of simply KDE in a rebranding in 2009. The KDE community's mascot is a green dragon named Konqi. Konqi's appearance was officially redesigned with the coming of Plasma 5, with Tyson Tan's entry winning the redesign competition on the KDE Forums.

In the beginning Matthias Ettrich chose to use Trolltech's Qt framework for the KDE project. Other programmers quickly started developing KDE/Qt applications, and by early 1997, a few applications were being released. On 12 July 1998 the first version of the desktop environment, called KDE 1.0, was released. The original GNU General Public Licensed version of this toolkit only existed for platforms that used the X11 display server, but as of the release of Qt 4, GNU Lesser General Public Licensed versions are available for more platforms. This allowed KDE software based on Qt 4 or newer versions to be distributed to Microsoft Windows and OS X.

The KDE Marketing Team announced a rebranding of the KDE project components on 24 November 2009. Motivated by the perceived shift in objectives, the rebranding focused on emphasizing both the community of software creators and the various tools supplied by the KDE, rather than just the desktop environment. KDE 4 was split into KDE Plasma Workspaces, KDE Applications, and KDE Frameworks (KDE Platform 4 at the time), bundled as KDE Software Compilation 4. Since 2009, the name KDE no longer stands for K Desktop Environment, but for the community that produces the software.

== Community ==
=== KDE e.V. organization ===
The financial and legal matters of KDE are handled by KDE e.V., a German non-profit organization. Among others, it owns the KDE trademark and the corresponding logo. It also accepts donations on behalf of the KDE community, helps to run the servers, assists in organizing and financing conferences and meetings, but does not influence software development directly.

=== Local communities ===
In many countries, KDE has local branches. These are either informal organizations (KDE India) or like the KDE e.V., given a legal form (KDE France). The local organizations host and maintain regional websites, and organize local events, such as tradeshows, contributor meetings and social community meetings.

=== Identity ===
KDE has community identity guidelines (CIG) for definitions and recommendations which help the community to establish a unique, characteristic, and appealing design. The KDE official logo displays the white trademarked K-Gear shape on a blue square with mitred corners. Copying of the KDE Logo is subject to the LGPL. Some local community logos are derivations of the official logo.

Many KDE applications have a K in the name, mostly as an initial letter. The K in many KDE applications is obtained by spelling a word which originally begins with C or Q differently, for example Konsole and Kaffeine, while some others prefix a commonly used word with a K, for instance KGet. However, some apps do not to have a K in the name at all, such as with Stage, Spectacle, Discover and Dolphin.

== Projects ==
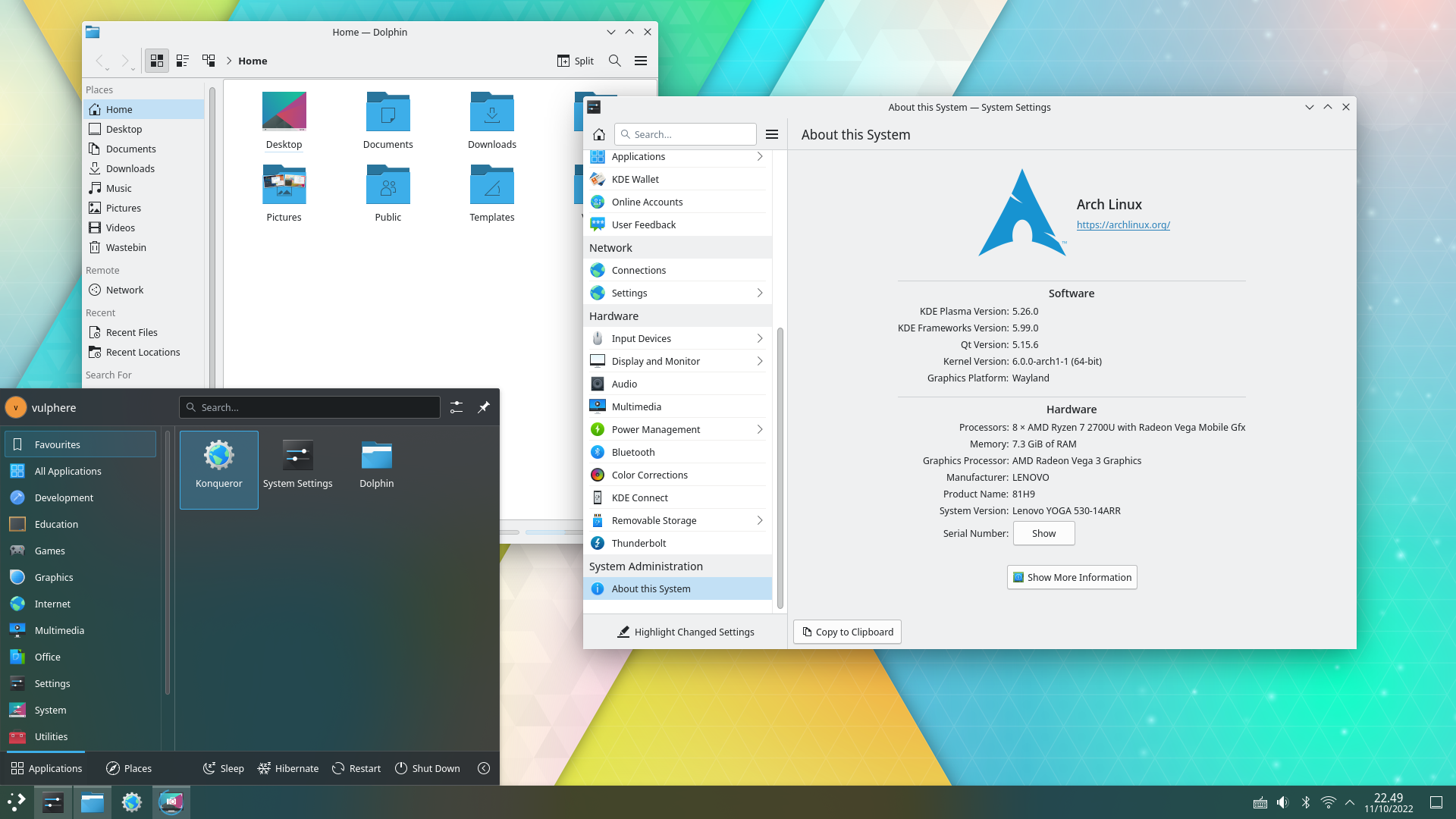
KDE Plasma 5.26 showing Breeze Twilight theme

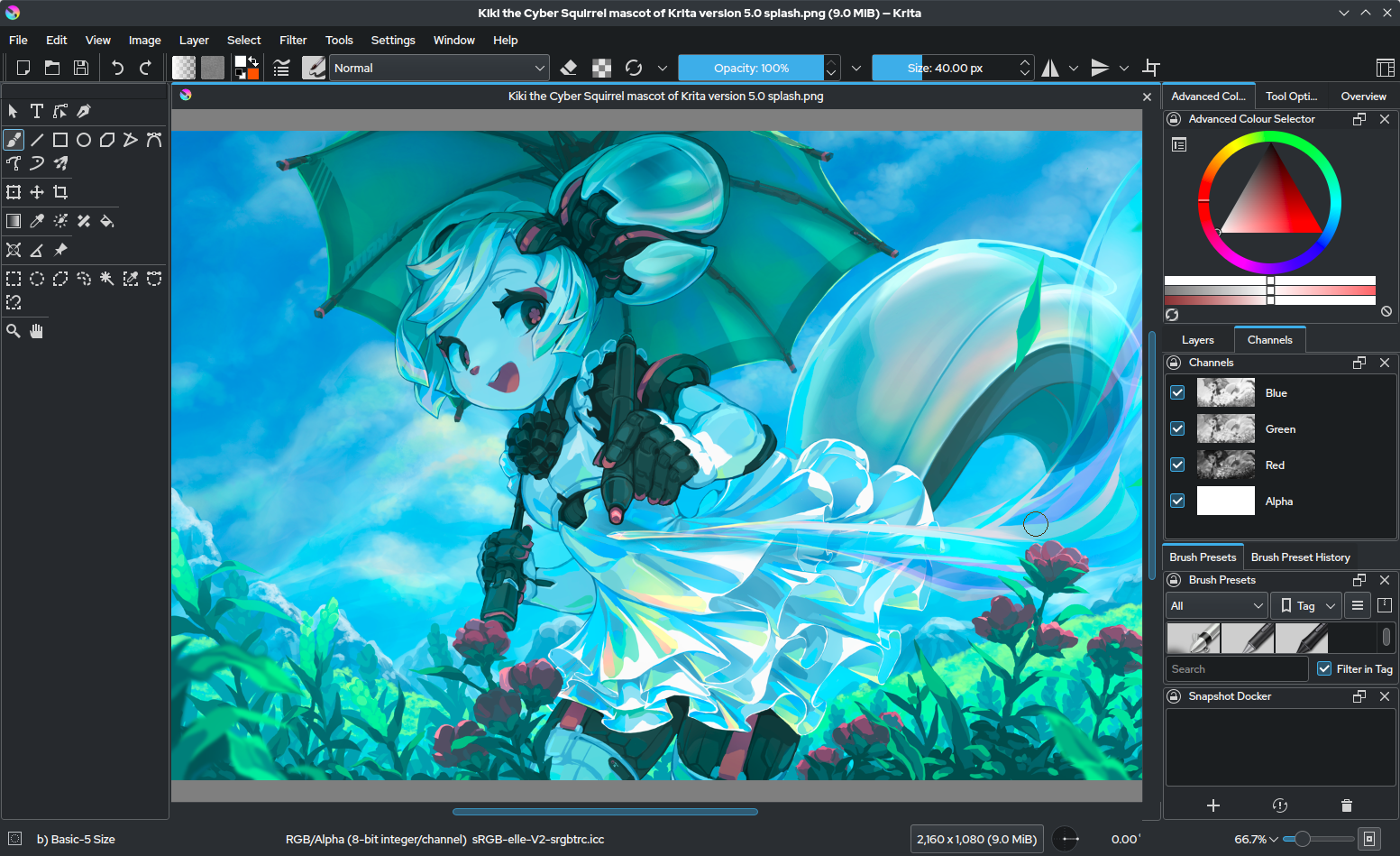
Krita 5.0.0 interface screenshot with Kiki

The KDE community maintains multiple free-software projects. The project formerly referred to as KDE (or KDE SC (Software Compilation)) nowadays consists of three parts:

- KDE Plasma, a graphical desktop environment with customizable layouts and panels, supporting virtual desktops and widgets. Written with Qt and KDE Frameworks.
- KDE Frameworks, a collection of libraries and software frameworks built on top of Qt (formerly known as 'kdelibs' or 'KDE Platform').
- KDE Gear, utility applications (like Kdenlive or Krita) mostly built on KDE Frameworks and which are often part of the official KDE Applications release.

=== Other projects ===
==== KDE neon ====
KDE neon is a Linux distribution that uses Ubuntu LTS as a core. It aims to provide the users with rapidly updated Qt and KDE software, while updating the rest of the OS components from the Ubuntu repositories at the normal pace.

==== Subtitle Composer ====
Subtitle Composer is an open-source subtitle editor for the Linux and Microsoft Windows operating systems, based on Qt and KDE Frameworks. The project became part of KDE starting in December 2019. It supports the most common text and bitmap-based subtitle formats, video previewing, audio waveform, speech recognition, timings synchronization, subtitle translation, OCR and JavaScript macros/scripting. Subtitle Composer is free software released under the GNU General Public License.

== Contributors ==
Developing KDE software is primarily a volunteer effort, although various companies, such as Novell, Nokia, or Blue Systems employ or employed developers to work on various parts of the project. Since a large number of individuals contribute to KDE in various ways (e.g. code, translation, artwork), organization of such a project is complex. A mentor program helps beginners to get started with developing and communicating within KDE projects and communities.

Communication within the community takes place via mailing lists, IRC, blogs, forums, news announcements, wikis and conferences. The community has a Code of Conduct for acceptable behavior within the community.

=== Development ===
Currently the KDE community uses the Git version control system. The KDE GitLab Instance (named Invent) gives an overview of all projects hosted by KDE's Git repository system. Phabricator is used for task management.

On 20 July 2009, KDE announced that the one millionth commit has been made to its Subversion repository. On 11 October 2009, Cornelius Schumacher, a main developer within KDE, wrote about the estimated cost (using the COCOMO model with SLOCCount) to develop KDE software package with 4,273,291 LoC, which would be about US$175,364,716. This estimation does not include Qt, Calligra Suite, Amarok, digiKam, and other applications that are not part of KDE core.

=== Core team ===
The overall direction is set by the KDE Core Team. These are developers who have made significant contributions within KDE over a long period of time. This team communicates using the kde-core-devel mailing list, which is publicly archived and readable, but joining requires approval. KDE does not have a single central leader who can veto important decisions. Instead, the KDE core team consists of several dozens of contributors who make decisions not by a formal vote, but through discussions.

The developers also organize alongside topical teams. For example, the KDE Edu team develops free educational software. While these teams work mostly independent and do not all follow a common release schedule. Each team has its own messaging channels, both on IRC and on the mailing lists.

=== KDE Patrons ===
A KDE Patron is an individual or organization supporting the KDE community by donating at least 5000 Euro (depending on the company's size) to the KDE e.V. As of March 2026, there are thirteen such patrons: Blue Systems, Canonical Ltd., Google, GnuPG, Kubuntu Focus, Slimbook, SUSE, The Qt Company, TUXEDO Computers, Rocky Linux, Framework Computer, Techpaladin Software, and Mbition.

== Collaborations ==
=== Wikimedia ===
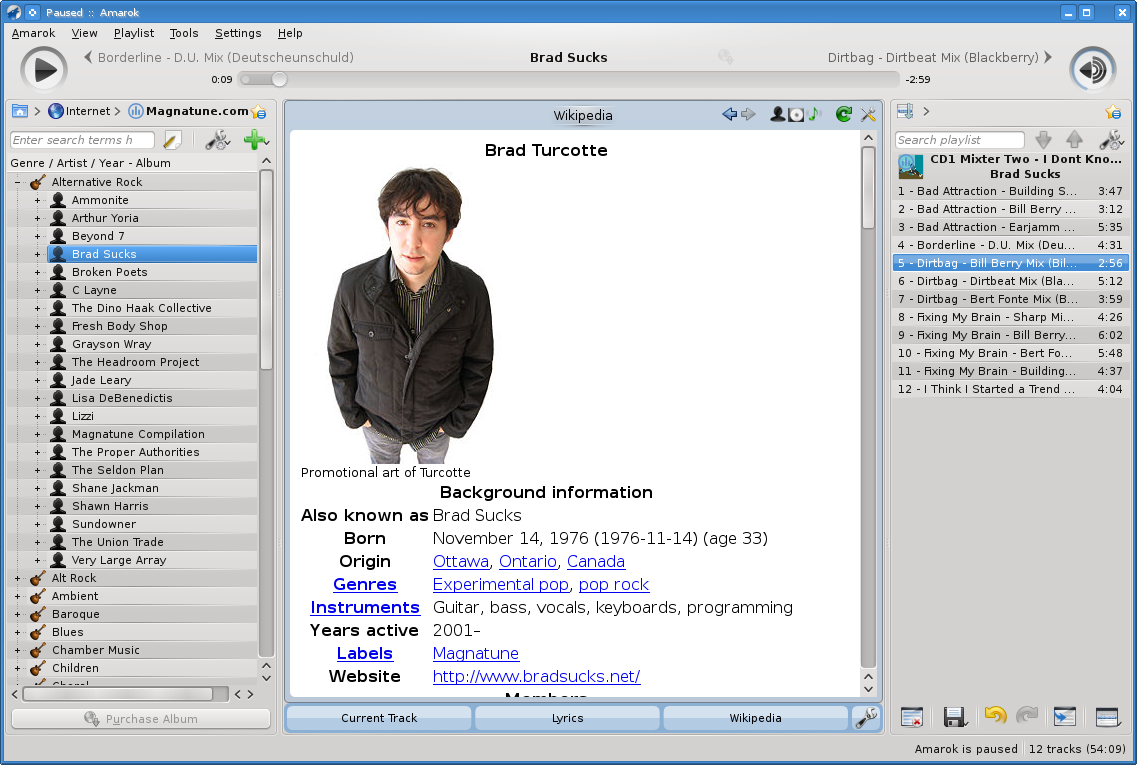
Amarok with information retrieved from Wikipedia

On 23 June 2005, the chairman of the Wikimedia Foundation announced that the KDE community and the Wikimedia Foundation have begun efforts towards cooperation. Fruits of that cooperation are MediaWiki syntax highlighting in Kate and accessing Wikipedia content within KDE applications, such as Amarok and Marble.

On 4 April 2008, the KDE e.V. and Wikimedia Deutschland opened shared offices in Frankfurt, later they separately moved to Berlin.

=== Free Software Foundation Europe ===
In May 2006, KDE e.V. became an Associate Member of the Free Software Foundation Europe (FSFE).

On 22 August 2008, KDE e.V. and FSFE jointly announced that after working with FSFE's Freedom Task Force for one and a half years KDE adopts FSFE's Fiduciary Licence Agreement. Using that, KDE developers can – on a voluntary basis – assign their copyrights to KDE e.V.

In September 2009, KDE e.V. and FSFE moved into shared offices in Berlin.

=== Commercial enterprises ===
Several companies actively contribute to KDE, like Collabora, Erfrakon, Intevation GmbH, Kolab Konsortium, Klarälvdalens Datakonsult AB (KDAB), Blue Systems, and KO GmbH.

Nokia used Calligra Suite as base for their Office Viewer application for Maemo/MeeGo. They have also been contracting KO GmbH to bring MS Office 2007 file format filters to Calligra. Nokia also employed several KDE developers directly – either to use KDE software for MeeGo (e.g. KCal) or as sponsorship.

The software development and consulting companies Intevation GmbH of Germany and the Swedish KDAB use Qt and KDE software – especially Kontact and Akonadi for Kolab – for their services and products, therefore both employ KDE developers.

=== Others ===
KDE participates in freedesktop.org, an effort to standardize Unix desktop interoperability.

In 2009 and 2011, GNOME and KDE co-hosted their conferences Akademy and GUADEC under the Desktop Summit label.

In December 2010 KDE e.V. became a licensee of the Open Invention Network.

Many Linux distributions and other free operating systems are involved in the development and distribution of the software, and are therefore also active in the KDE community. These include commercial distributors such as SUSE/Novell or Red Hat but also government-funded non-commercial organizations such as the Scientific and Technological Research Council of Turkey with its Linux distribution Pardus.

In October 2018, Red Hat declared that KDE Plasma was no longer supported in future updates of Red Hat Enterprise Linux, though it continues to be part of Fedora. The announcement came shortly after the announcement of the business acquisition of Red Hat by IBM for close to US$43 billion. As a result, Fedora now makes KDE Plasma and other KDE software available also to Red Hat Enterprise Linux users through their Extra Packages for Enterprise Linux (EPEL) project.

== Releases ==
K Desktop Environment 1.0

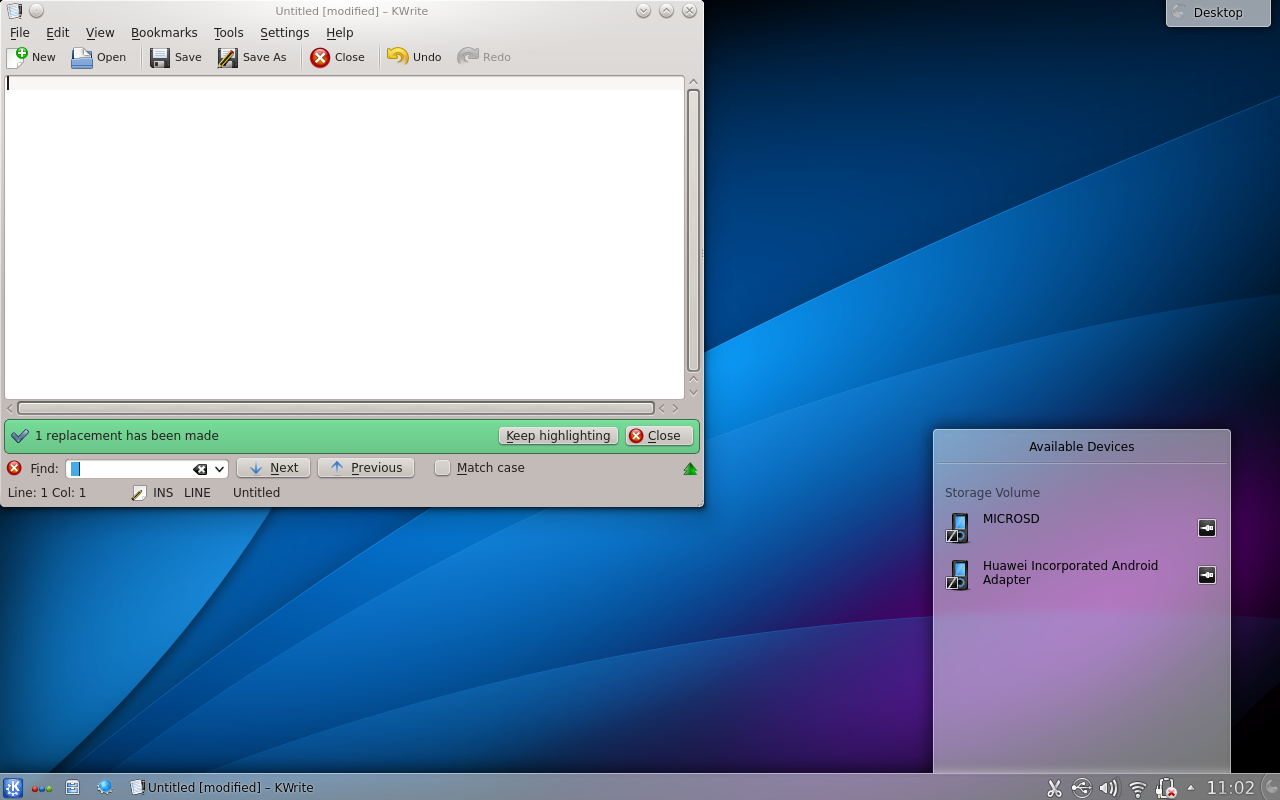
KDE Software Compilation 4

| Version | Date | Information |
|---|---|---|
| | 14 October 1996 | KDE development announced |
| K Desktop Environment 1 | 12 July 1998 | |
| K Desktop Environment 2 | 23 October 2000 | |
| K Desktop Environment 3 | 3 April 2002 | |
| KDE Software Compilation 4 | 11 January 2008 | |
| KDE Plasma 5 | 15 July 2014 | former KDE/KDE SC split into KDE Plasma, KDE Frameworks and KDE Applications |
| KDE Plasma 6 | 28 February 2024 | Public release |

== Activities ==
The two most important conferences of KDE are Akademy and Camp KDE. Each event is on a large scale, both thematically and geographically. Akademy-BR and Akademy-es are local community events.

=== Akademy ===
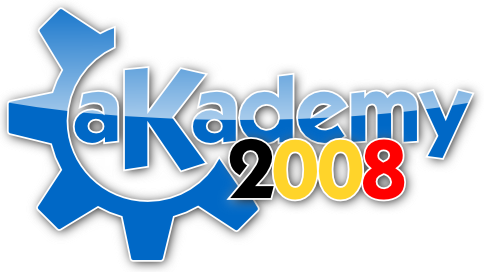
Akademy 2008 logo

Akademy is the annual world summit, held each summer at varying venues in Europe. The primary goals of Akademy are to act as a community building event, to communicate the achievements of community, and to provide a platform for collaboration with community and industry partners. Secondary goals are to engage local people, and to provide space for getting together to write code. KDE e.V. assist with procedures, advice and organization. Akademy including conference, KDE e.V. general assembly, marathon coding sessions, BOFs (birds of a feather sessions) and social program. BOFs meet to discuss specific sub-projects or issues.

The first conference that the KDE community held was KDE One, in Arnsberg, Germany, in 1997 to discuss the first KDE release. Initially, each conference was numbered after the release, and not regular held. Since 2003 the conferences were held once a year. And they were named Akademy since 2004.

The yearly Akademy conference gives Akademy Awards, are awards that the KDE community gives to KDE contributors. Their purpose is to recognize outstanding contribution to KDE. There are three awards, best application, best non-application and jury's award. As always the winners are chosen by the winners from the previous year. First winners received a framed picture of Konqi signed by all attending KDE developers.

=== Camp KDE ===
| Year | Venue | Date |
|---|---|---|
| 2009 | Negril, Jamaica | 17–18 January |
| 2010 | La Jolla, US | 15–22 January |
| 2011 | San Francisco, US | 4–5 April |

Camp KDE is another annual contributor's conference of the KDE community. The event provides a regional opportunity for contributors and enthusiasts to gather and share their experiences. It is free to all participants. It is intended to ensure that KDE in the world is not simply seen as being Euro-centric. The KDE e.V. helps travel and accommodation subsidies for presenters, BoF leaders, organizers or core contributor. It is held in the North America since 2009.

In January 2008, KDE 4.0 Release Event was held at the Google headquarters in Mountain View, California, US, to celebrate the release of KDE SC 4.0. The community realized that there was a strong demand for KDE events in the Americas, therefore Camp KDE was produced.

Camp KDE 2009 was the premiere meeting of the KDE Americas, was held at the Travellers Beach Resort in Negril, Jamaica, sponsored by Google, Intel, iXsystem, KDE e.V. and Kitware. The event included 1–2 days of presentations, BoF meetings and hackathon sessions. Camp KDE 2010 took place at the University of California, San Diego (UCSD) in La Jolla, US. The schedule included presentations, BoFs, hackathons and a day trip. It started with a short introduction by Jeff Mitchell, who was the principal organizer of the conference, talked a bit of history about Camp KDE and some statistics about the KDE community. With around 70 participants, the talks of the event were relatively well attended. On 1/19, the social event was a tour of a local brewery. Camp KDE 2011 was held at Hotel Kabuki in San Francisco, US. It was co-located with the Linux Foundation Collaboration Summit. The schedule included presentations, hackathons and a party at Noisebridge. The conference opened with an introduction by Celeste Lyn Paul.

=== SoK (Season of KDE) ===
Season of KDE is an outreach program hosted by the KDE community. Students are appointed mentors from the KDE community that help bring their project to fruition.

=== Other community events ===
conf.KDE.in
| Year | Venue | Date |
|---|---|---|
| 2011 | Bengaluru | 9–13 March |

conf.kde.in was the first KDE and Qt conference in India. The conference, organized by KDE India, was held at R.V. College of Engineering in Bengaluru, India. The first three days of the event had talks, tutorials, and interactive sessions. The last two days were a focused code sprint. The conference was opened by its main organizer, Pradeepto Bhattacharya. Over 300 people were at the opening talks. The Lighting of the Auspicious Lamp ceremony was performed to open the conference. The first session was by Lydia Pintscher, who spoke on "So much to do – so little time". At the event, the return of Project Neon was announced on March 11, 2011, with the project providing nightly builds of the KDE Software Compilation. Closing the conference was keynote speaker and old-time KDE developer Sirtaj.

Día KDE
| Year | Venue | Date |
|---|---|---|
| 2011 | Rosario | 27 August |

Día KDE (KDE Day) is an Argentinian event focused on KDE. It gives talks and workshops. The purposes of the event are to: spread the free software movement among the population of Argentina, bringing to it the KDE community and environment developed by it; know and strengthen KDE-AR; and generally bring the community together to have fun. The event is free.

A Release party is a party, which celebrates the release of a new version of the KDE SC (twice a year). KDE also participates in other conferences that revolve around free software.

== Notable uses ==
Brazil's primary school education system operated computers running KDE software, with more than 42,000 schools in 4,000 cities, thus serving nearly 52 million children at the time. The base distribution was called Educational Linux, which was based on Kubuntu. Besides this, thousands more students in Brazil use KDE products in their universities. KDE software is also running on computers in Portuguese and Venezuelan schools, with respectively 700,000 and one million systems reached.

Through Pardus, a local Linux distribution, many sections of the Turkish government made use of KDE software, including the Turkish Armed Forces, Ministry of Foreign Affairs, Ministry of National Defence, Turkish Police, and the SGK (Social Security Institution of Turkey), although these departments often do not exclusively use Pardus as their operating system. Pardus does not offer KDE Plasma anymore, making only GNOME and XFCE its only two available options.

CERN (European Organization for Nuclear Research) uses KDE software.

Germany uses KDE software in its embassies around the world, representing around 11,000 systems.

NASA used the Plasma Desktop during the Mars Mission.

Valve Corporation's handheld gaming computer, the Steam Deck, uses the KDE Plasma desktop environment when in desktop mode. In 2025, Valve Corporation has revealed that their upcoming compact gaming computer, the Steam Machine, and virtual reality headset, named the Steam Frame, will also be using the KDE Plasma desktop environment when in desktop mode.

Several computer hardware manufacturers also ship laptops and desktop computers with KDE Plasma pre-installed as the default desktop environment, such as the Kubuntu Focus line of laptops developed in collaboration between the Kubuntu Council, MindShareManagement, and Tuxedo Computers.

== See also ==
- KDE Projects
- List of KDE applications
- Free software community
- Trinity Desktop Environment
