= EndeavourOS =

Linux distribution based on Arch Linux

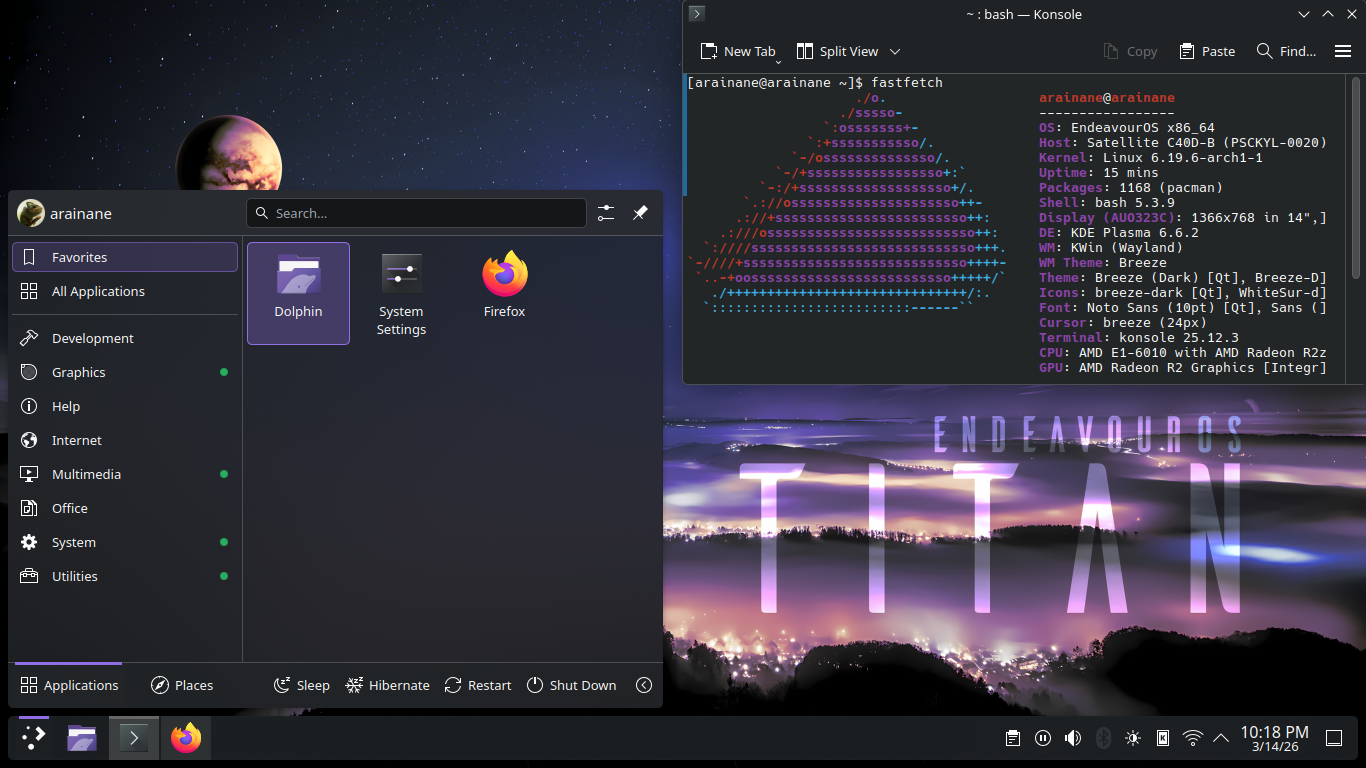
- EndeavourOS Titan with KDE Plasma 6
- Developer: Bryan Poerwoatmodjo, Fernando Omiechuk Frozi, Johannes Kamprad, Manuel
- OS family: Linux (Unix-like)
- Working state: Current
- Source model: Open-source
- Initial release: EndeavourOS 19.6 / 15 July 2019 (7 years ago)
- Latest release: 2026.03.06 Titan / 12 March 2026 (6 months ago)
- Marketing target: Personal computers
- Update method: Rolling release (Pacman)
- Package manager: Pacman, Yay
- Supported platforms: x86-64; ARMv7/ARMv8
- Kernel type: Monolithic (Linux kernel)
- Default user interface: KDE Plasma (default); GNOME; Xfce; Cinnamon; MATE; Budgie; LXQt; LXDE; i3
- Preceded by: Antergos
- Official website: endeavouros.com

EndeavourOS is a free and open-source Arch-based Linux distribution. EndeavourOS began as a successor to Antergos, a discontinued distribution also based on Arch Linux. It uses the same rolling release schedule as Arch Linux, but periodically releases updated installation media (ISO files). As of March 16, 2026, the most recent release is "EndeavourOS Titan."

== History ==
EndeavourOS began as a continuation of the Antergos Linux distribution, a distribution itself based on Arch Linux, a general-purpose Linux distribution. In May 2019, Antergos' developers abruptly announced that development on the project would cease; a moderator of Antergos' forums, Bryan Poerwoatmodjo, discussed the idea of maintaining the community on a new forum. The idea received support from within the community, and within a day other Antergos moderators joined the project. Development on EndeavourOS quickly began, with the team planning to create a distribution that would be close to Arch Linux with the convenience of a GUI installer, while leaving GUI Pacman wrappers such as Pamac from the out-of-box installation. The first release was in July 2019.

On September 11, 2019, EndeavourOS announced that they would release an online magazine, called Discovery, to give their users some background information on Arch commands and to inform them on new packages to explore. The magazine was launched in November 2019. It was later discontinued in April 2021 due to a lack of writers.

EndeavourOS used to offer "community editions" providing the window managers QTile, BSPWM, Openbox and the EndeavourOS exclusive Worm, as well as the Sway Wayland compositor. These were discontinued starting with the "Galileo" release due to a lack of maintainers and were officially removed with the release of the Galileo ISO on November 20, 2023.

== Installation ==
EndeavourOS features a graphical installer, unlike the distribution it is based on, Arch Linux, where installation is typically performed manually through the command-line tool pacstrap or through the archinstall script. For this reason, EndeavourOS is typically marketed as a beginner-friendly introduction to Arch Linux, though not as beginner-friendly as most Ubuntu-based distros due to its terminal-centric nature. Since EndeavourOS is based on Arch, it provides most upstream features as-is.

EndeavourOS uses the Calamares system installer. While EndeavourOS was originally planned to ship with Cnchi, the net-installer used by Antergos, technical difficulties resulted in the adoption of an offline installer based on Portergos, a Linux distribution also based on Antergos, as a stop-gap until the issues could be resolved later in development. After the official launch of the distribution, the EndeavourOS team began to develop a Calamares net-installer, which was expected to release in November 2019, but was delayed to December. The net-installer offers multiple desktop environments, window managers, driver and firmware packages, and kernels during the installation process. The net-installer also allows the user to perform an offline install with the default KDE Plasma (formerly Xfce) desktop themed with EndeavourOS branding.

EndeavourOS provides access to the Arch User Repository (AUR), a collection of unofficial community-maintained source packages shipped by Arch Linux, by default through the yay package manager.

== See also ==
- List of Linux distributions § Pacman-based
- Manjaro
- Garuda Linux
