= Calamares (software) =

Free and open-source system installer for Linux distributions

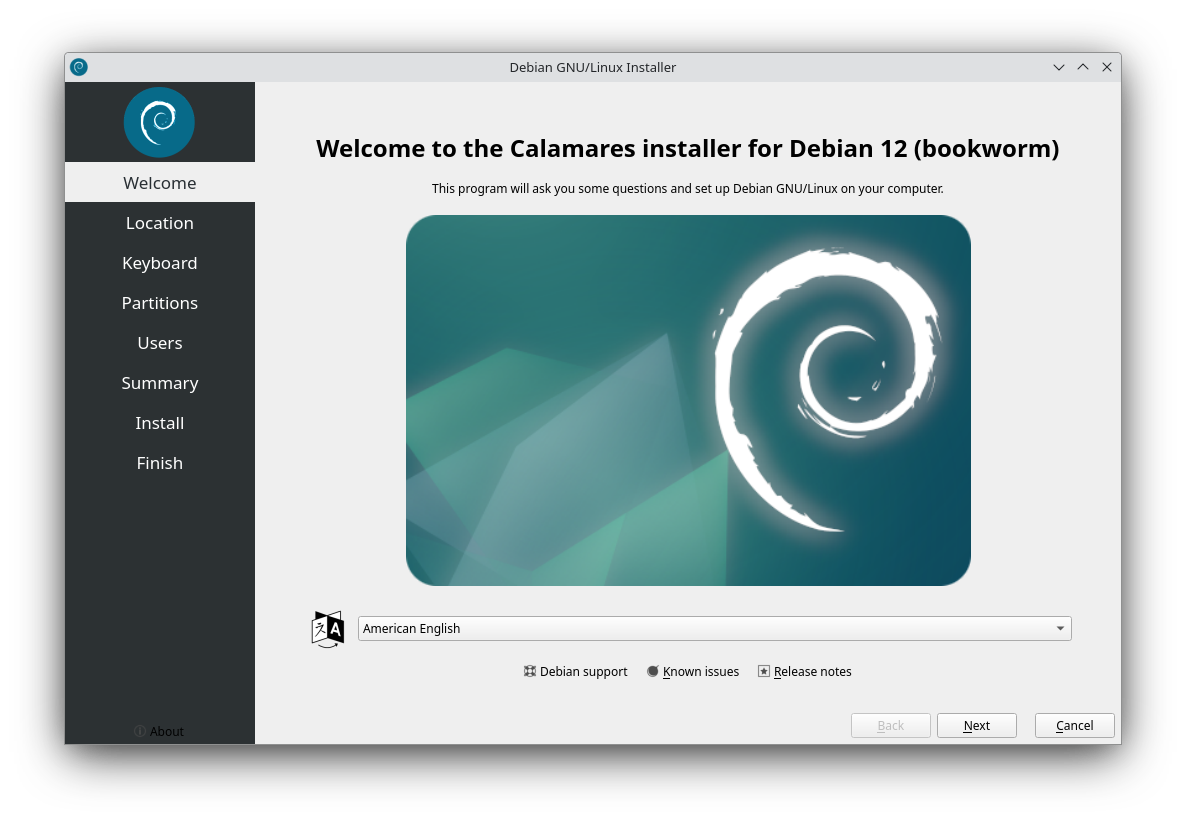
- Calamares installing Debian
- Original author: Teo Mrnjavac
- Developers: The Calamares team, Blue Systems, various distro developers
- Release: January 31, 2015; 11 years ago
- Stable release: 3.4.3 / 9 September 2026; 55 days ago
- Written in: C++ and Python
- Operating system: Linux
- Available in: 80 languages
- Type: System installer
- License: Multiple (Free software)
- Website: calamares.io
- Repository: codeberg.org/Calamares/calamares.git

Calamares is a free and open-source independent and "distribution-agnostic" system installer for Linux distributions (distros).

== About ==
Calamares is used by NixOS, CachyOS, Garuda Linux, Huayra GNU/Linux, Manjaro, Netrunner, KaOS, KDE neon, Kubuntu, Lubuntu, EndeavourOS, Peppermint OS, Artix Linux, OpenMandriva Lx, Q4OS, the Live medium of Debian, TUXEDO OS and several less known Linux distributions. It also has been used to help automate the installation of command line distributions and to make custom distros.

Development was started in 2014 by Manjaro community member Teo Mrnjavac "with support from Blue Systems" and then picked up by KaOS.

Calamares is designed to be highly customizable for different Linux distributions. It includes advanced partitioning features that support both manual and automated partitioning operations.

== Configuration ==
Calamares is configurable using a mix of code modules and built in tools. Distro developers can add their own branding and configuration. However, some distro makers opt to leave the installer to its default look and options.

== See also ==
- Anaconda
- YaST
- Debian-Installer
- Ubiquity
