= Manjaro =

Linux distribution based on Arch Linux with rolling releases

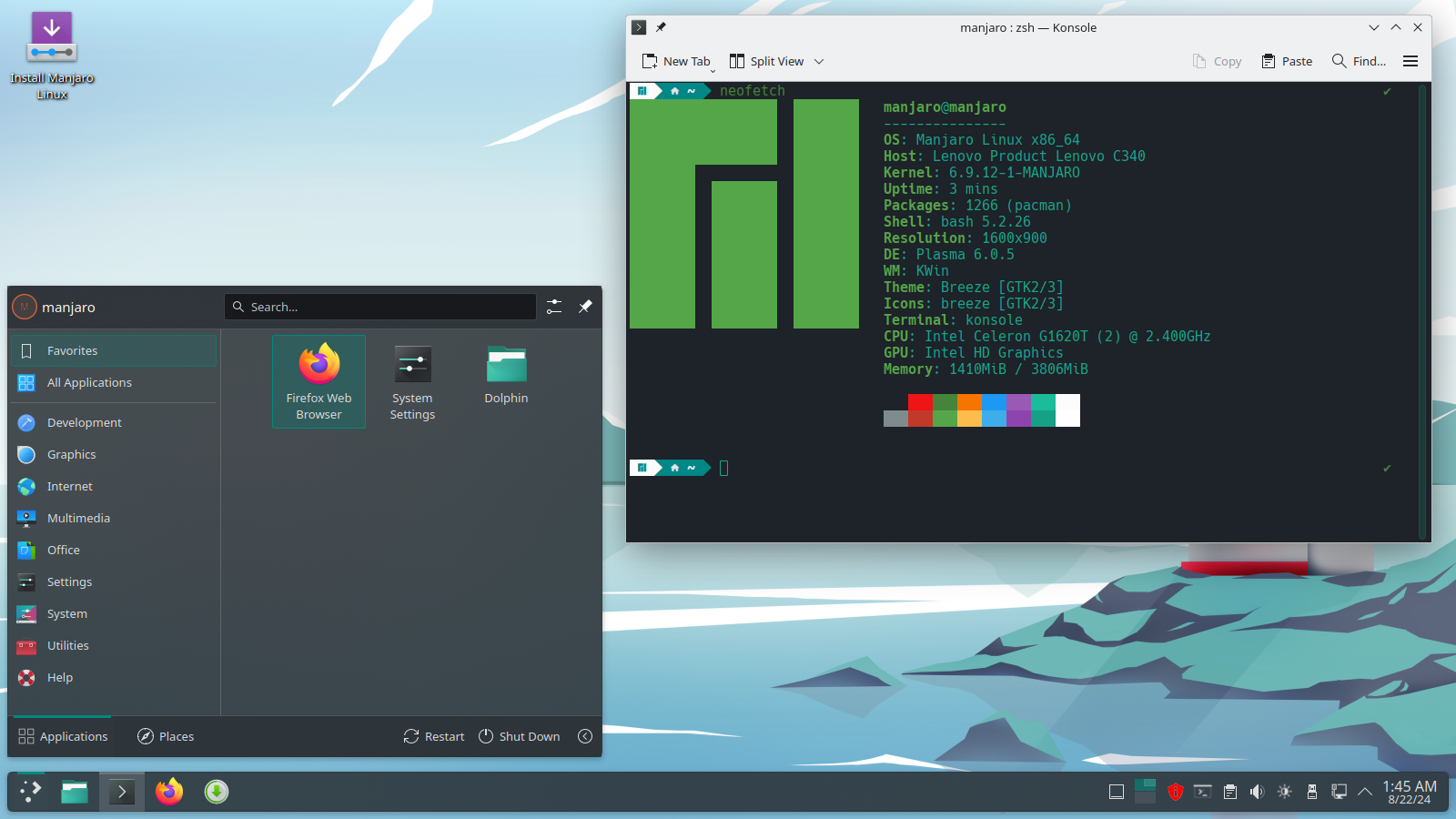
- Manjaro 24.0 "Wynsdey" (KDE Plasma 6)
- Developer: Manjaro GmbH & Co. KG
- OS family: Linux
- Working state: Current
- Source model: Open-source
- Initial release: 10 July 2011; 15 years ago
- Latest release: 26.1 / 13 August 2026; 3 months ago
- Repository: code.manjaro.org
- Package manager: pamac (GUI/CLI), pacman, libalpm (back-end)
- Supported platforms: x86-64 Unofficial: i686 (Note: i686 support is maintained by the manjaro32 project.); ARM (armhf and AArch64) (Note: ARM support is maintained by the Manjaro ARM project.)
- Kernel type: Monolithic (Linux kernel)
- Userland: GNU
- Default user interface: KDE Plasma 6, Xfce, GNOME, Plasma Mobile, Phosh
- License: Free software licenses (mainly GNU GPL)
- Official website: manjaro.org

Manjaro (/mænˈdʒɑːroʊ/ man-JA-row) is a free and open-source Linux distribution based on the Arch Linux operating system with a focus on user-friendliness, accessibility, and improved software testing and stability compared to its upstream sources. It uses a rolling release update model with Pacman-derived package managers. Manjaro is developed mainly in Austria, France and Germany.

Reviewers often describe Manjaro Linux as a Linux distribution that is easy to set up and use, suitable for both beginners and experienced users. It is recommended as an easy and friendly way to install and maintain a cutting-edge Arch-derived distribution. Some reviewers find appeal in the large range of contributed software available in the Arch User Repository (AUR), which has a reputation for being kept up to date from upstream resources. Others highlight the wide selection of official and community editions with different desktop environments.

== History ==
Manjaro was first released on 10 July 2011. By mid 2013, it was in the beta stage, though key elements of the final system had all been implemented, including a GUI installer (then an Antergos installer fork); a package manager (Pacman) with a choice of frontends; Pamac (GTK) for Xfce desktop and Octopi (Qt) for its Openbox edition; MHWD (Manjaro Hardware Detection, for detection of free & proprietary video drivers); and Manjaro Settings Manager (for system-wide settings, user management, and graphics driver installation and management).

GNOME Shell support was dropped with the release of version 0.8.3 in 2012. However, efforts within Arch Linux made it possible to restart the Cinnamon/GNOME edition as a community edition. An official release offering the GNOME desktop environment was reinstated in March 2017.

During the development of Manjaro 0.9.0 at the end of August 2015, the team decided to switch to year and month designations for Manjaro's version scheme instead of numbers. This applies to both the 0.8.x series as well as the new 0.9.x series—renaming 0.8.13, released in June 2015, as 15.06 and so on. Manjaro 15.09, codenamed Bellatrix and formerly known as 0.9.0, was released on 27 September 2015 with the new Calamares installer and updated packages.

In September 2017, Manjaro announced that support for i686 architecture would be dropped because "popularity of this architecture is decreasing". However, in November 2017 a semi-official community project "manjaro32", based on archlinux32, continued i686 support.

In September 2019, the Manjaro GmbH & Co. KG company was founded. The It's FOSS website stated the company was formed '... to effectively engage in commercial agreements, form partnerships, and offer professional services'.

In November 2026, seven founding members registered the non-profit Manjaro Project e.V. (eingetragener Verein, a German registered association) with the goal to move Manjaro away from the Manjaro GmbH & Co. KG company. The move is intended to have the development become fully independent of the commercial entity, thereby restoring trust and attracting more support from developers.

== Official editions ==
For x86-64 processors, Manjaro offers downloads configured with one of three desktops:

- Manjaro Plasma, featuring Manjaro's own dark Plasma theme and the latest KDE Plasma 6, apps and frameworks.
- Manjaro Xfce, featuring Manjaro's own dark theme and the Xfce desktop.
- Manjaro GNOME became the third official version with the Gellivara release; it offers the GNOME desktop with a version of the Manjaro theme.

While not official releases, Manjaro Community Editions are maintained by members of the Manjaro community. Three of these configurations are available for download at Manjaro's website: Cinnamon, i3, and Sway.

Manjaro also has official editions for devices with ARM processors, such as single-board computers and Pinebook notebooks.

== Features ==
Manjaro comes with both a CLI and a graphical installer. The rolling release model means that users do not need to upgrade/reinstall the whole system to keep it all up-to-date inline with the latest release. Package management is handled by Pacman via the command line (terminal) and via front-end GUI package manager tools like the pre-installed Pamac. It can be configured as either a stable system (default) or bleeding edge, in line with Arch.

The repositories are managed with their own tool, BoxIt, which is designed like Git.

Manjaro includes its own GUI settings manager where options like language, drivers, and kernel version can be configured.

Certain commonly used Arch utilities, such as the Arch Build System (ABS), are available but have alternate implementations in Manjaro.

Manjaro Architect is a CLI net installer that allows users to choose their own kernel versions, drivers, and desktop environments during the install process. Both the official and the community edition's desktop environments are available for selection. For GUI-based installations, Manjaro uses the GUI installer Calamares.

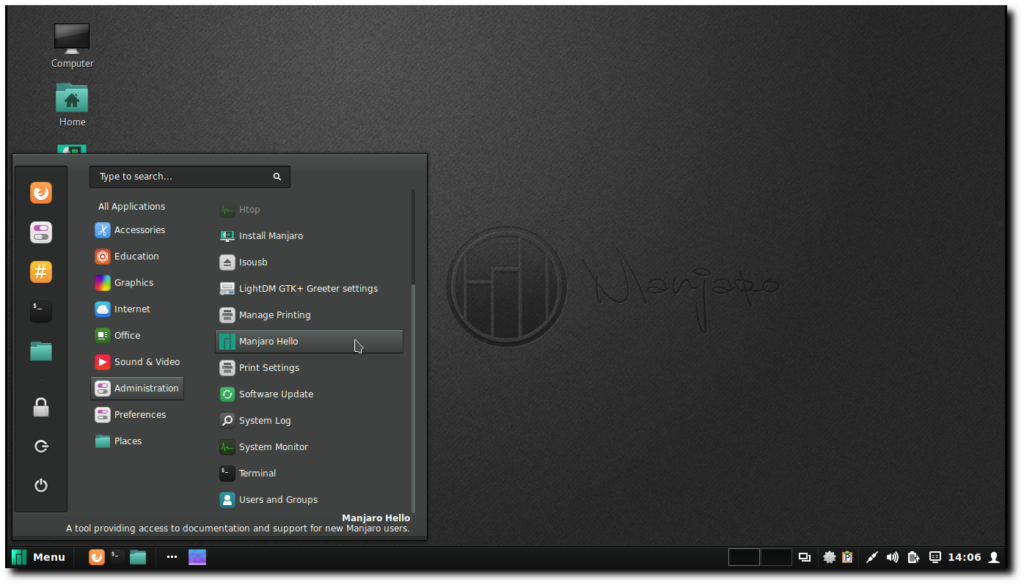
Screenshot of Manjaro 17.0 Cinnamon Edition

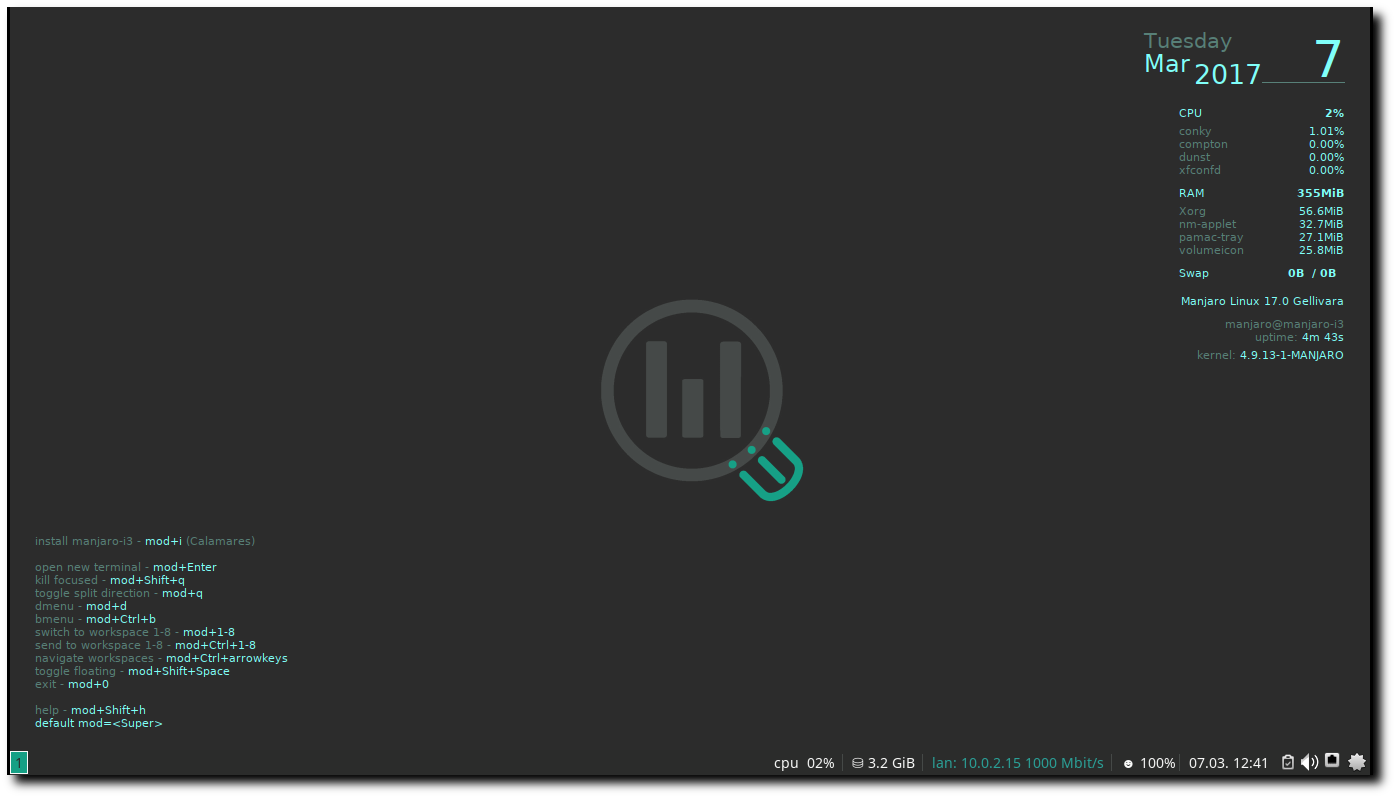
Screenshot of Manjaro 17.0 i3 Edition

== Release history ==
The 0.8.x series releases were the last versions of Manjaro to use a version number. The desktop environments offered, as well as the number of programs bundled into each separate release, have varied in different releases.

Manjaro typically includes the latest versions of supported desktop environments.

Version	Release date	Codename	Kernel	Notes
0.1	2011-07-10			
0.8.0	2012-08-20	Askella	3.4.9	Only Xfce and KDE Plasma editions
0.8.1	2012-09-21	Askella	3.4.x	
0.8.2	2012-11-10	Askella	3.4.x	
0.8.3	2012-12-24	Askella	3.4.x	
0.8.4	2013-02-25	Askella	3.7.x	
0.8.5	2013-04-13	Askella	3.8.5	
0.8.6	2013-06-02	Askella	3.9.x	
0.8.7	2013-08-26	Askella	3.4.59 LTS	
0.8.8	2013-11-24	Askella	3.10.20	
0.8.9	2014-02-23	Askella	3.10.30	Support for LUKS and LVM partition encryption, improved UEFI support, improved filesystem detection and handling.
0.8.10	2014-06-09	Askella	3.12.20	
0.8.11	2014-12-01	Askella		
0.8.12	2015-02-06	Askella		
0.8.13	2015-06-14	Askella		
15.09	2015-09-27	Bellatrix	4.2.0	
15.12	2015-12-22	Capella		
16.06	2016-06-06	Daniella		
16.06.1	2016-06-11	Daniella		
16.08	2016-08-31	Ellada		
16.10	2016-10-31	Fringilla		
17.0	2017-03-07	Gellivara	4.9 LTS	First official version with GNOME
17.1	2017-12-31	Hakoila	4.14 LTS	First made available pre-installed on the Manjaro Notebook from Station X, the Spitfire.
18.0	2018-10-30	Illyria	4.19 LTS	
18.1.0	2019-09-12	Juhraya	4.19 LTS	Choice between LibreOffice and FreeOffice during installation
19.0	2020-02-25	Kyria	5.4 LTS	
20.0	2020-04-26	Lysia	5.6.7	
20.1	2020-09-11	Mikah	5.8	Manjaro Architect edition now supports ZFS installations. Building AUR packages is now part of upgrade process.
20.2	2020-12-03	Nibia	5.9	
21.0	2021-03-24	Ornara	5.10 LTS	
21.1	2021-08-17	Pahvo	5.13	
21.2.0	2021-12-23	Qonos	5.15	
21.2.1	2022-01-04	Qonos	5.15	
21.2.2	2022-01-23	Qonos	5.15	
21.3.0	2022-06-17	Ruah	5.15	
22.0.0	2022-09-12	Sikaris	6.1	
22.1.0	2023-04-21	Talos	6.1	
23.0.0	2023-09-06	Uranos	6.5	
23.1.0	2023-12-16	Vulcan	6.6 LTS	
24.0.0	2024-05-14	Wynsdey	6.9	
24.1.0	2024-10-01	Xahea	6.10	
24.2.0	2024-12-08	Yonada	6.12	
25.0.0	2025-04-15	Zetar	6.12	
26.0.0	2026-01-04	Anh-linh	6.18	
26.1.0	2026-08-12	Bian-May	7.1	
Legend: Unsupported Latest version Future version

== Relation to Arch Linux ==
The main difference compared to Arch Linux is the repositories.

Manjaro uses three sets of repositories:

- Unstable: contains the most up to date Arch Linux packages. Unstable is synced several times a day with Arch package releases.
- Testing: contains packages from the unstable repositories after they have been tested by users.
- Stable: contains only packages that are deemed stable by the development team, which can mean a delay of a few weeks before getting major upgrades.

As of January 2019, package updates derived from the Arch Linux stable branch to the Manjaro stable branch typically have a lag of a few weeks. (Note: Lag figure did not differentiate for package updates needed for fixing security vulnerabilities)

== Derivatives ==
Two defunct distributions were developed in cooperation with Manjaro:.

- Netrunner Rolling, a variant of the Debian-based Netrunner distribution by Blue Systems. The first version of Netrunner Rolling was 2014.04, which was based on Manjaro 0.8.9 KDE. It was released in 2014. The last released version was Netrunner Rolling 2019.04.
- The Sonar GNU/Linux project aimed to provide a barrier-free Linux to people who required assistive technology for computer use, with support for GNOME and MATE desktops. The first version was released in February 2015 and the last in 2016. The Sonar project was discontinued in 2017.

== Hardware ==
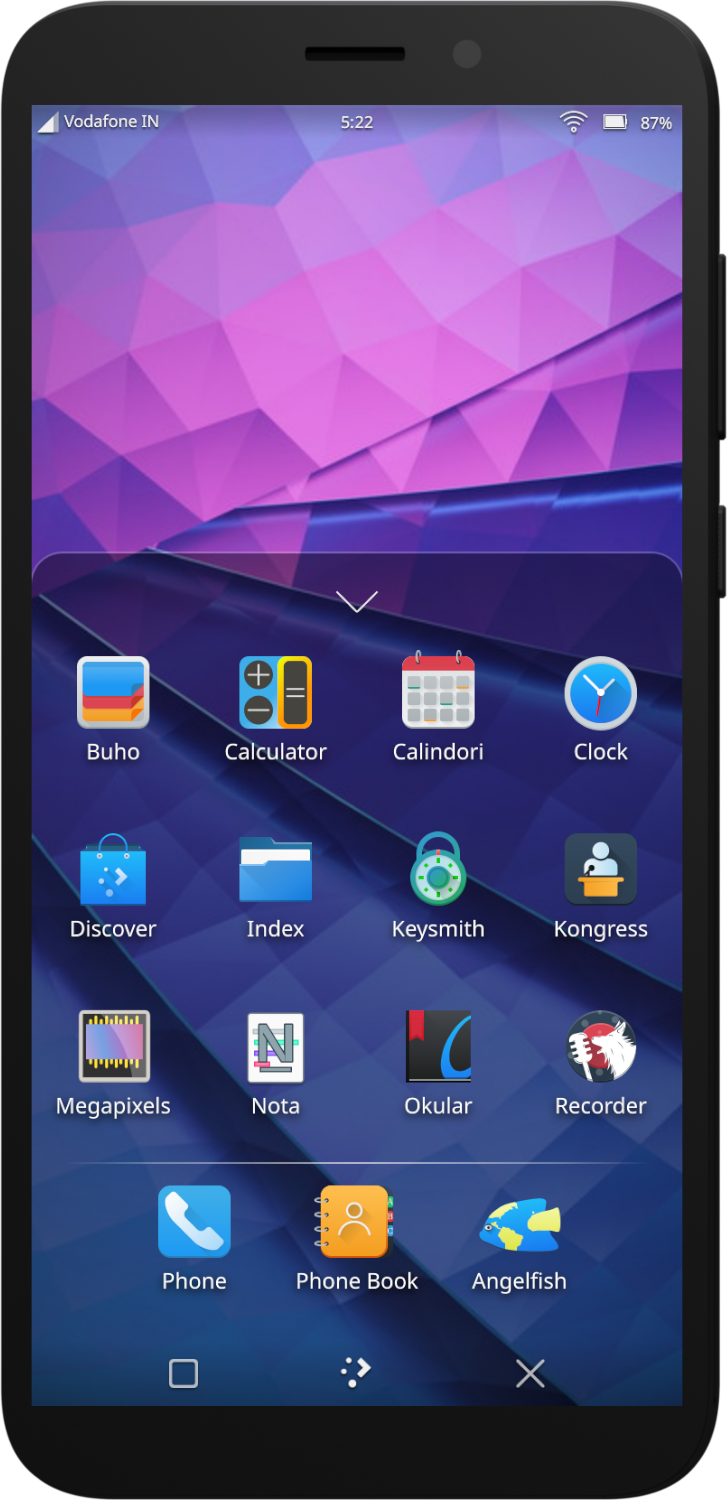
Manjaro on the PinePhone

Although Manjaro can be installed on most systems, some vendors sell computers with Manjaro pre-installed on them. Suppliers of computers pre-installed with Manjaro include StarLabs Systems, Tuxedo Computers, manjarocomputer.eu and Pine64.

Manjaro with Plasma Mobile desktop environment is the default operating system on PinePhone, an ARM-based smartphone released by Pine64.

== Reception ==
Over the years, Manjaro Linux has been recognized as a desktop easy to set up and use, suitable for both beginners and experienced users. It is recommended as an easy and friendly way to install and maintain a cutting-edge Arch-derived distribution. Some reviewers find appeal in the large range of contributed software available in the AUR, which has a reputation for being kept up to date from upstream resources. Others highlight the wide selection of official and community editions with different desktop environments.

Very early versions of Manjaro had a reputation for crashing and for installation difficulties, but this was reported to have improved with later versions, and by 2014 was, according to Jesse Smith of DistroWatch, "proving to be probably the most polished child of Arch Linux I have used to date. The distribution is not only easy to set up, but it has a friendly feel, complete with a nice graphical package manager, quality system installer and helpful welcome screen. Manjaro comes with lots of useful software and multimedia support."

Smith did a review of Manjaro 17.0.2 Xfce in July 2017, and observed that it did "a lot of things well". He went on to extol some of the notable features as part of his conclusion:

"I found Manjaro's Xfce edition to be very fast and unusually light on memory. The distribution worked smoothly and worked well with both my physical hardware and my virtual environment. I also enjoyed Manjaro's habit of telling me when new software (particularly new versions of the Linux kernel) was available. I fumbled a little with Manjaro's settings panel and finding some settings, but in the end I was pleased with the range of configuration I could achieve with the distribution. I especially like that Manjaro makes it easy to block notifications and keep windows from stealing focus. The distribution can be made to stay pleasantly out of the way."
