= Everaldo Coelho =

Brazilian graphic designer and illustrator (born 1978)

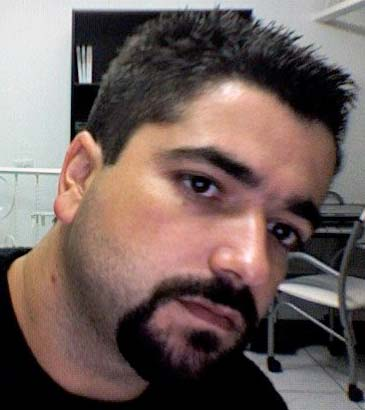
- Coelho in the mid-2000s
- Born: March 25, 1978 (age 48)
- Known for: Graphic design, illustration
- Notable work: Crystal icons

Everaldo Coelho (Portuguese: [eveˈɾawdu kuˈeʎu]; born March 25, 1978) is a Brazilian graphic designer and illustrator. He specializes in iconography, themes and user interface design. Everaldo's works include general illustrations, comics, children's books, corporate design and many other areas. He is known in Linux circles for his "Crystal" icon theme.

== Career ==
Everaldo worked for Conectiva and LindowsOS, and later as a freelance artist for SUSE, KDE, Mozilla and many other Linux-related projects. He worked on projects for Mac OS X and Microsoft Windows XP platforms. In 2004, he joined Lindows.com as a full-time Lindows.com employee. From 2012 to 2018, he was Head of UX at Movile, and also worked as a consultant at Yellowicon Studio. Since 2023, he began mentoring new designers at BeYou Education and at the nonprofit organization Endeavor. In 2025, he joined DataBank as a full-time principal designer.

Everaldo began his career as an illustrator. He has illustrated many children's books, school books, and magazines (including one specializing in Linux). In 1998, when Everaldo bought his first PC, he saw a Mac in the computers store. He installed Linux on the machine, and began making themes.

In 2000, he made icons for Conectiva as a freelancer. Later, he was hired to work in their creation department. He designed Conectiva's Linux interface. His first KDE job was a splash screen, which he did in his free time. Helio Castro sent it to KDE-Look, introducing Everaldo and the KDE community to each other.

== Crystal ==
Everaldo's signature style is known as a "crystal" look. It consists of icons that appear to be made of highly reflective surfaces. The Crystal Icons theme that he created for KDE has been used in many different applications and websites. Coelho would later create the Crystal Clear icon set, where the icons also appear to be transparent.

When Everaldo started to work on Conectiva Linux 8, he wanted to create customized icons. Conectiva wanted to attract both Windows XP and Mac OS X users. This inspired him to focus on an intermediate concept of icons, "between realism of Mac OS X and cartoon colored style of XP". The result was the Crystal Icon set.

Before 2001, the default icon theme for KDE was Torsten Rahn's HiColor. In 2001, Frank Karlitschek created the website "KDE-Look", which introduced Rahn to Everaldo's Crystal. He discontinued the work on HiColor and joined Everaldo's work on Crystal. Crystal SVG became the default icon theme in KDE 3.1.

=== Crystal Icon examples ===

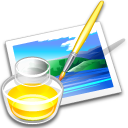

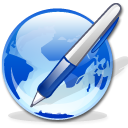

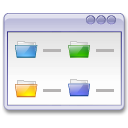

== See also ==
- Frutiger Aero
