= Sirius (disambiguation) =

Sirius is the brightest star in the Earth's night sky.

Sirius may also refer to:

== Businesses and organisations ==
- SES Sirius, a Scandinavian satellite operator
  - Sirius (satellite), a constellation of communications satellites
- Sirius-Aero, a Russian airline
- Sirius College, a school network established by Turkish Australians
- Sirius Corporation, a British open-source software services company
- Sirius Entertainment, an American comic book publisher
- Sirius Minerals, a British fertilizer development company
- Sirius Real Estate, a property company investing in German business parks
- Sirius Software, a 1980s video game publisher
- Sirius Systems Technology, American computer manufacturer of the Sirius 1 in 1981
- SiriusXM, an American broadcasting company
  - Sirius Satellite Radio, a former satellite radio service
    - Sirius Canada
  - List of Sirius XM Radio channels

== Mythology ==
- Sirius (mythology), the god who personifies the star in Greek mythology
- Maera (hound), sometimes referred to as Sirius
- Sirius (dog), a mythological companion of Orion according to Homer

== Places ==
- Sirius Cliffs, in Antarctica
- Sirius Islands, in Antarctica
- Sirius Knoll, in Antarctica
- Mount Sirius, in Antarctica
- Sirius Building, an apartment complex in Sydney, Australia
- Sirius (urban-type settlement), in Russia

== Science and technology ==
- Sirius (synchrotron light source), at the Laboratório Nacional de Luz Síncrotron in Brazil
- Eclipse Sirius, an open-source software project
- Ferranti Sirius, a 1961 small business computer
- Sirius visualization software, software for modeling molecules, discontinued since 2011
- SIRIUS (software), a software for annotating small molecules from mass spectrometry data
- Scientific International Research in Unique Terrestrial Station, a series of spaceflight experiments

== Arts and entertainment ==
=== Fictional entities ===
- Sirius, the eponymous character of Sirius (novel), by Olaf Stapledon, 1944
- Sirius (Re:Zero), a character in the light novel series Re:Zero − Starting Life in Another World
- Sirius, in video game Bomberman 64
- Sirius, a playable character in the video game Brawl Stars
- Sirius, in the novel Planet of the Apes
- Sirius, a planet in video game Serious Sam II
- Sirius Amory, in The Amory Wars series
- Sirius Black, in the Harry Potter series
- Sirius Cybernetics Corporation, a company in The Hitchhiker's Guide to the Galaxy
- R.U. Sirius, a space station in the Brewster Rockit: Space Guy! comic strip

=== Film ===
- Sirius (1942 film), a Hungarian film
- Sirius (1975 film), a Czechoslovak war drama film
- Sirius (2013 film), a documentary film

=== Music ===
- Sirius (Coleman Hawkins album), 1974
- Sirius (Clannad album), 1987
- "Sirius" (instrumental), a 1982 instrumental by the Alan Parsons Project
- Sirius (Stockhausen), a composition by Karlheinz Stockhausen
- Sirius, a 2015 mini album by Daizystripper
- "Sirius", a song by Bump of Chicken from the 2019 album Aurora Arc
- "Sirius", a song by Diaura from the 2013 album Focus
- "Sirius", a song by Eir Aoi
- "Sirius", a song by Mike Oldfield from the 2002 album Tres Lunas
- Quasimidi Sirius, a music synthesizer

=== Other uses in arts and entertainment ===
- Sirius the Jaeger, an anime TV series
- Sirius: An Apocalyptic Order, 2022 documentary TV series
- Sirius: The Dog Star, a 2004 anthology of short stories
- Beatmania IIDX 17: Sirius, a 2009 video game
- Sirius (novel), a 1944 novel by Olaf Stapledon
- Sirius (game), an abstract strategy game published in 1976

== Transport ==
=== Ships ===
- HMAS Sirius (O 266), a Royal Australian Navy tanker
- HMS Sirius, the name of several Royal Navy ships
- HSwMS Sirius, the name of several Swedish Navy ships
- MV Sirius, a Greenpeace ship
- NB Sirius, a narrowboat conversion design
- RFA Sirius (A345), a Royal Fleet Auxiliary tanker, launched as SS Empire Faun
- SS Sirius, the name of several steamships
- USS Sirius, the name of several US Navy ships
- USNS Sirius (T-AFS-8), a US Navy support ship
- FV Sirius (1926), a German fishing trawler in service 1926–29

=== Other uses in transport ===
- Sirius 20, a Canadian sailboat design
- Sirius 21, a Canadian sailboat design
- Sirius 22, a Canadian sailboat design
- Sirius 28, a Canadian sailboat design
- Alpaero Sirius, or Noin Siriua, a French motor glider
- Lockheed Model 8 Sirius, a 1929 monoplane
- Mitsubishi Sirius engine, an automobile engine

== Other uses ==
- Sirius (wine), produced by Sean Thackrey
- Sirius Dog Sled Patrol, a Danish naval unit
- IK Sirius, Swedish sports club
- R. U. Sirius (Ken Goffman, born 1952), an American writer
- Sirius (police dog), New York City police dog

== See also ==
- Sirius B (disambiguation)
