= Sirius B (disambiguation) =

Sirius B is part of the Sirius binary star system.

Sirius B may also refer to:

- Sirius B (album), a 2004 album by Therion
- Sirius.B (band), a musical group from Asheville, North Carolina

== See also ==
- Sirius (disambiguation)
