= OpenDesktop =

OpenDesktop is:

- an online community for open source content and applications, see openDesktop.org
- the name of an operating system of the Santa Cruz Operation
- the former name of a Linux distribution now called Co-CreateLinux
