= Netrunner (operating system) =

Linux operating system

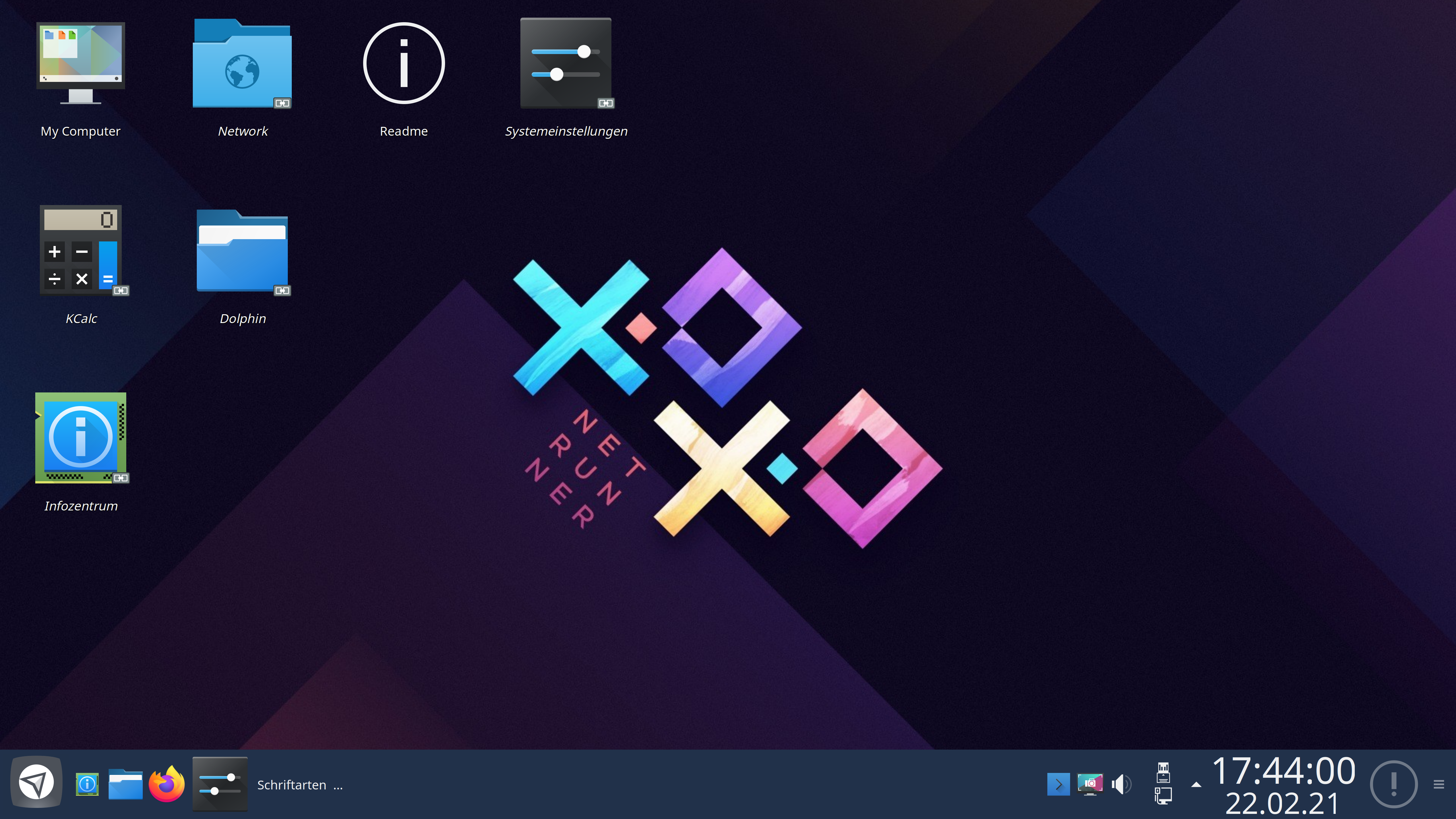
- Netrunner 21.01 Desktop
- Developer: Blue Systems
- OS family: Linux
- Working state: Active
- Source model: Open source
- Initial release: 18 March 2010; 16 years ago (Netrunner 1 Albedo)
- Latest release: Netrunner 26 / 2 April 2026; 5 months ago
- Available in: Multilingual (more than 55)
- Package manager: dpkg (Debian GNU/Linux Package Manager)
- Supported platforms: x86, amd64, armhf
- License: Free software licenses (mainly GPL)
- Official website: www.netrunner.com

Dock preview of Linux Netrunner 13.12

Netrunner is a Debian-based open source Linux distribution for desktop computers, laptops, netbooks and ARM-based devices.

Two versions of Netrunner are available: Desktop and Core.

== Overview ==
Netrunner is a 64-bit desktop operating system and uses the Calamares graphical installer. Netrunner 1 Albedo (the first version of Netrunner) was first released on March 18, 2010. Netrunner is based on Debian Stable. Its desktop environment is based on Plasma Desktop by KDE.

Netrunner Core is a desktop version containing only a small number of essential applications.

Netrunner has support for the Pinebook and Odroid C1 ARM.

The latest release, Netrunner 26, has switched to XLibre as the default display server.

== Default software ==
A default installation of Netrunner contains the following software:

- KDE Plasma Desktop
- Mozilla Firefox (including Plasma integration)
- Mozilla Thunderbird (including Plasma integration)
- VLC media player
- LibreOffice
- GIMP
- Krita
- Gwenview
- Kdenlive
- Inkscape
- Samba Mounter (NAS setup)
- Steam
- VirtualBox

== Release history ==
The following is the release history for Netrunner Core and Desktop:

| Version | Release date | Based On |
|---|---|---|
| Netrunner Desktop 26 | 2026-04-02 | Debian Stable 13 (Trixie); Plasma 6.3.6 |
| Netrunner Desktop 25 | 2025-02-10 | Debian Stable 12 (Bookworm); Plasma 5.27.5 |
| Netrunner Desktop 23 | 2023-01-20 | Debian Stable 11 (Bullseye); Plasma 5.20.5 |
| Netrunner Desktop 21.01 | 2021-02-20 | Debian Stable 10.7 (buster); Plasma 5.14.5 |
| Netrunner Desktop 20.01 | 2020-02-23 | Debian Stable 10.3 (buster); Plasma 5.14.5 |
| Netrunner Desktop 19.08 | 2019-08-20 | Debian Stable 10.0 (buster); Plasma 5.14.5 |
| Netrunner Desktop 19.01 | 2019-01-12 | Debian Testing Snapshot; Plasma 5.14.3 |
| Netrunner Desktop 18.03 | 2018-03-11 | Debian Testing Snapshot; Plasma 5.12.2 |
| Netrunner Desktop 17.10 Voyager | 2017-11-12 | Debian Testing Snapshot (20170923) |
| Netrunner Desktop 17.06 Daedalus | 2017-07-01 | Debian Testing |
| Netrunner Desktop 17.03 Cyclotron | 2017-03-31 | Debian Testing |
| Netrunner Core 17.01 | 2017-01-01 | Debian Testing Snapshot (20161211); Plasma 5.8.2 |
| Netrunner Desktop 17.01 | 2017-01-01 | Debian Testing Snapshot (20161211) |
| Netrunner Desktop 16.09 | 2016-11-05 | Debian Jessie 8 |
| Netrunner Core 16.09 | 2016-10-23 | Debian Jessie 8 |

The following is the release history for previously Kubuntu based Netrunner versions (discontinued):

| Version | Release date | Based On |
|---|---|---|
| Netrunner 17 Horizon | 2015-11-23 | Kubuntu "wily" |
| Netrunner 16 Ozymandias | 2015-05-16 | Kubuntu "vivid" |
| Netrunner 15 Prometheus | 2015-02-15 | Kubuntu "utopic" |
| Netrunner 14.2 Frontier | 2015-09-16 | Kubuntu "trusty"(LTS) |
| Netrunner 14.1 Frontier | 2015-01-24 | Kubuntu "trusty"(LTS) |
| Netrunner 14 Frontier | 2014-06-22 | Kubuntu "trusty"(LTS) |
| Netrunner 13.12 Enigma II | 2014-01-13 | Kubuntu "saucy" |
| Netrunner 13.06 Enigma | 2013-07-05 | Kubuntu "raring" |
| Netrunner 12.12 Dryland - Third Edition | 2012-12-22 | Kubuntu "quantal" |
| Netrunner 4.2 Dryland-2 | 2012-06-20 | Kubuntu "precise" |
| Netrunner 4.0 Dryland | 2011-12-29 | Kubuntu "oneiric" |
| Netrunner 3 Chromatic | 2011-04-14 | Kubuntu "natty" |
| Netrunner 2 Blacklight | 2010-07-15 | Kubuntu "lucid" |
| Netrunner 1 Albedo | 2010-03-18 | Linux Mint "karmic" |

The following is the release history for the Netrunner Rolling, which has been discontinued in favor of Manjaro collaboration efforts:

| Version | Release date | Based On |
|---|---|---|
| Netrunner Rolling 2019.04 | 2019-04-20 | Kernel 4.19.32 LTS, KDE Plasma 5.15.5 |
| Netrunner Rolling 2018.08 | 2018-08-05 | Kernel 4.17, KDE Plasma 5.13.3 |
| Netrunner Rolling 2018.01 | 2018-01-26 | KDE Plasma 5.11.5 |
| Netrunner Rolling 2017.07 | 2017-07-18 | Kernel 4.11.8, KDE Plasma 5.10.3 |
| Netrunner Rolling 2016.01 | 2016-02-27 | KDE Plasma 5.5.4 |
| Netrunner Rolling 2015.11 | 2015-11-13 | Manjaro KDE 15.09 (Update 6) |
| Netrunner Rolling 2015.09 | 2015-10-03 | Manjaro KDE 15.09 |
| Netrunner Rolling 2014.09.1 | 2014-09-25 | Manjaro KDE 0.8.10 |
| Netrunner Rolling 2014.04 | 2014-04-04 | Manjaro KDE 0.8.9 |
