= Trinity Desktop Environment =

Desktop environment for Unix-like operating systems

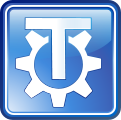

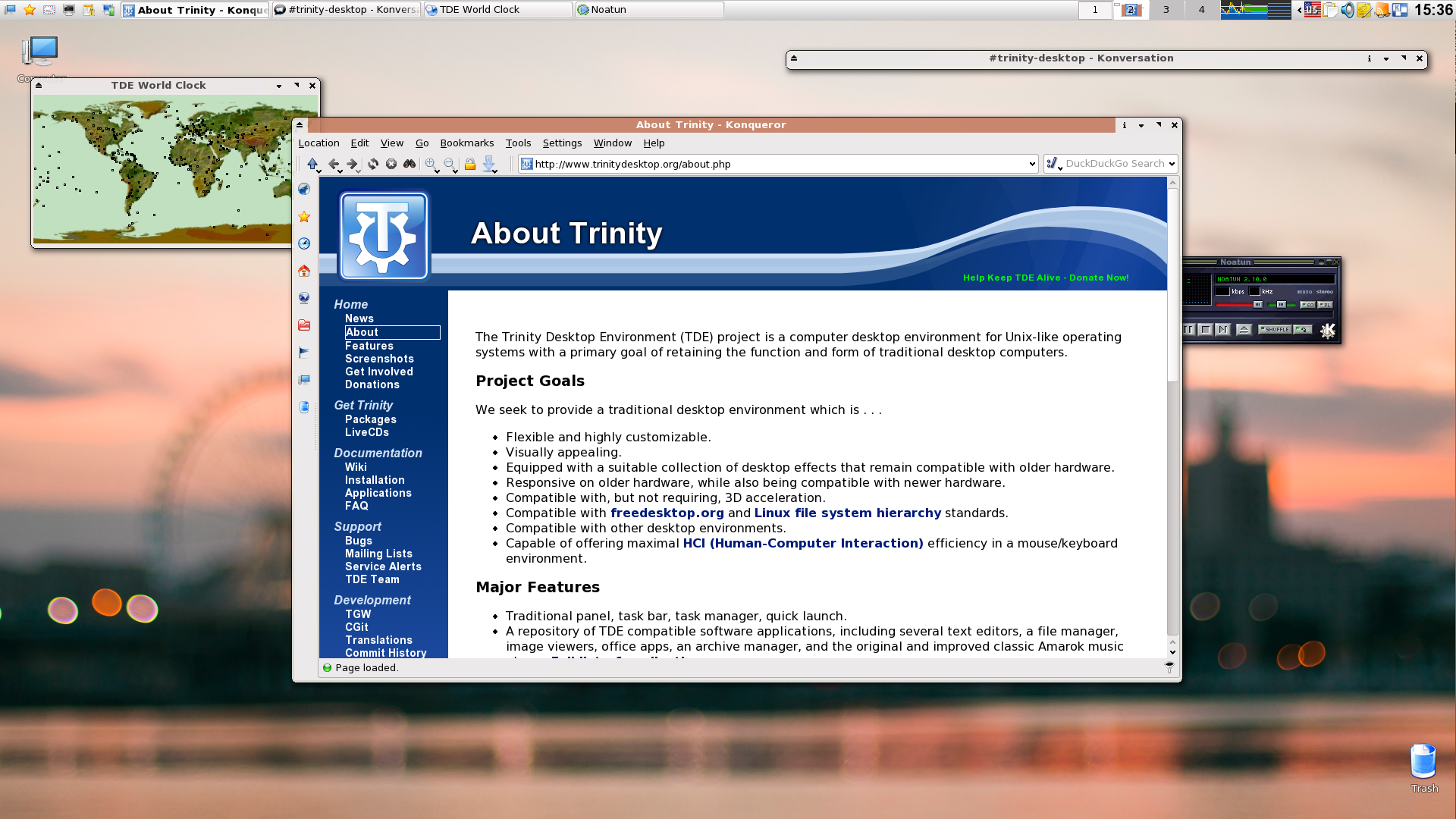
- Trinity R14.1.0
- Developer: TDE development team
- Release: April 29, 2010; 16 years ago
- Stable release: R14.1.7 / November 1, 2026; 4 days ago
- Written in: C++ (TQt)
- Operating system: Unix-like with X11
- Platform: FreeBSD and Linux
- Predecessor: K Desktop Environment 3
- Available in: Multilingual
- Type: Desktop environment
- License: GPL and other licenses
- Website: www.trinitydesktop.org
- Repository: git.trinitydesktop.org/cgit/

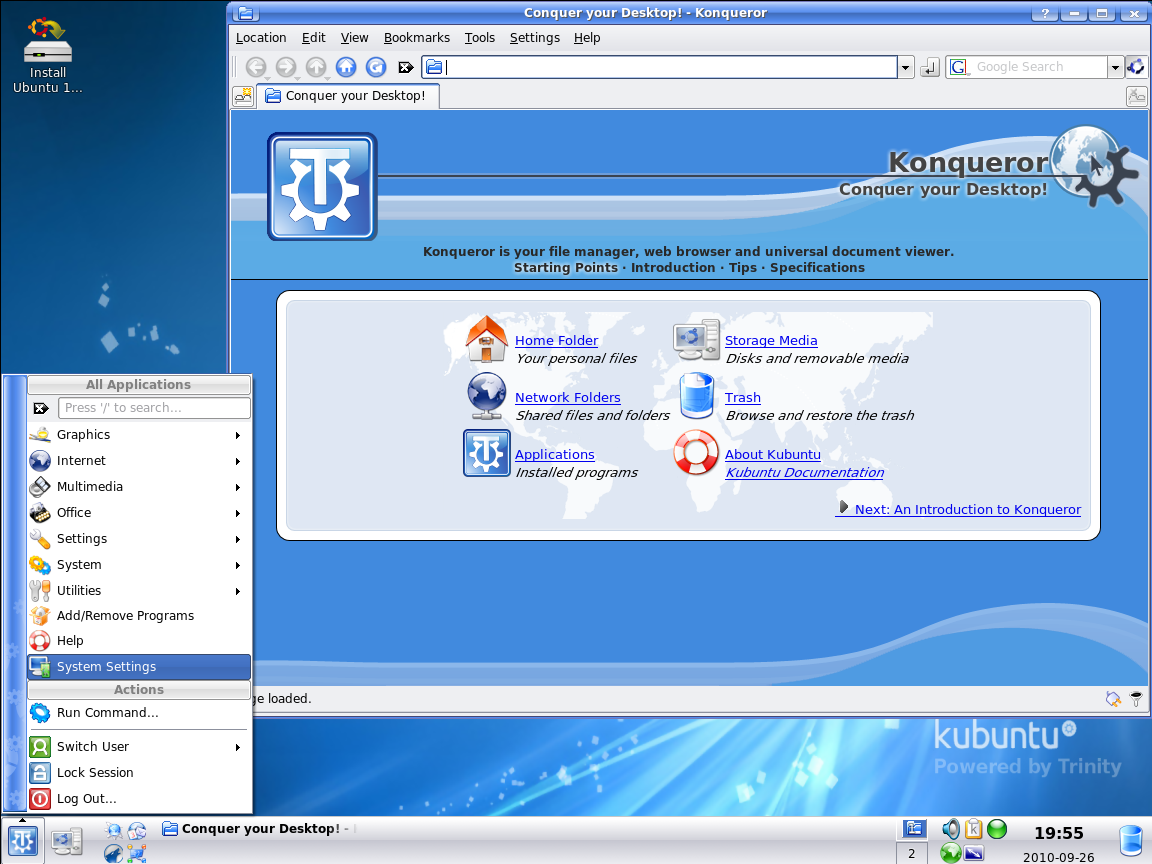
Trinity 3.5.12 for Kubuntu

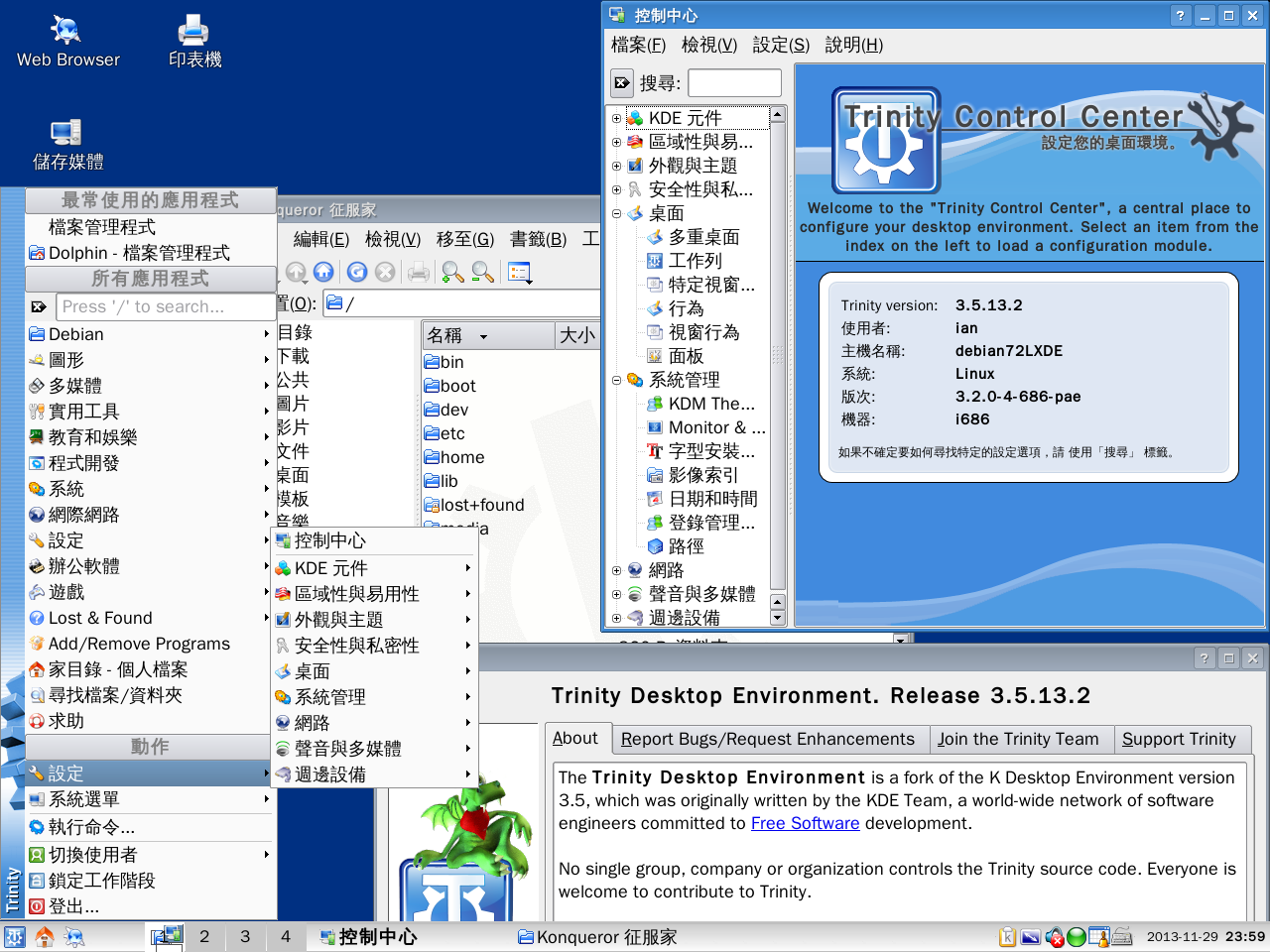
Trinity 3.5.13.2 (Traditional Chinese localisation)

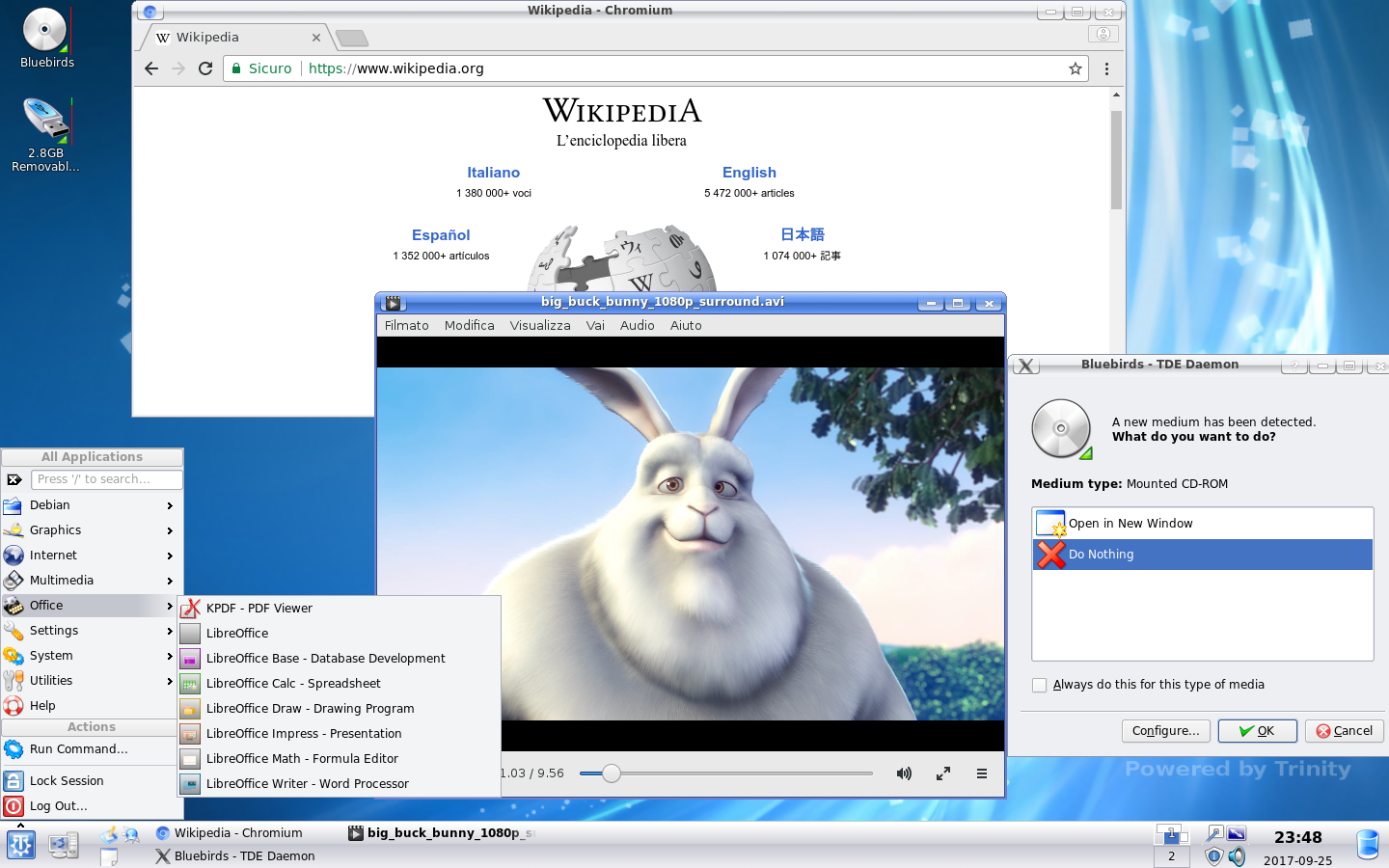
Trinity R14.0.4, Kubuntu version

The Trinity Desktop Environment (TDE) is a complete software desktop environment designed for Linux and Unix-like operating systems, intended for computer users preferring a traditional desktop model, and is free/libre software. Born as a fork of KDE 3.5 in 2010, it was originally created by Timothy Pearson, who had coordinated Kubuntu remixes featuring KDE 3.5 after Kubuntu switched to KDE Plasma 4.

TDE is now a fully independent project with its own development team, available for various Linux distros, BSD and DilOS. It is currently led by Slávek Banko.

TDE aims to provide a stable and highly customizable desktop, continuing bug fixes, additional features, and compatibility with recent hardware. Trinity is packaged for Arch Linux, Debian, Fedora, Gentoo, Mageia, OpenSUSE, Raspberry Pi OS, Red Hat Enterprise Linux, Slackware, Ubuntu and various other distributions and architectures. It is also used as the default desktop environment of at least two Linux distributions, Q4OS and Exe GNU/Linux. Since version 3.5.12 (its second official release), it uses its own fork of Qt3, known as TQt, so as to make it easier to eventually make TQt installable alongside later Qt releases. Trinity also maintains its own versions of several KDE software applications using TQt, while still providing feature updates and ensuring compatibility with recent distributions and hardware.

== Releases ==
Early releases of Trinity used a versioning scheme based on that of K Desktop Environment 3.5, from which it was forked. The R14.0 release adopted a new versioning scheme, to prevent comparisons with KDE based on version number alone and a new visual theme. This new visual theme was based on the "KDE Lineart" background included in the wallpapers package for KDE 3.4 and covered the desktop background and was named "Trinity Lineart" along with the splash screen, "application info screens" (for some apps like Konqueror and Trinity Control Center), and banners (for some other apps like KPersonalizer and Kate). The window, widget, and icon themes were left intact, aside from replacing all KDE logos with Trinity logos.

Prior to this, Trinity kept the KDE 3.5 visual theme, but replaced the "KDE 3.5" branding with "TDE" branding, in a font that is not the "Kabel Book" font KDE used, although the K-Menu had its side image branded as just "Trinity" instead of "TDE". Kubuntu versions, on the other hand, used the included "Crystal Fire" background as the default desktop background, along with the K-Menu "side image", larger menu items, and menu layout from Kubuntu 8.04.

=== History ===
Date	Event
3.5.x
29 April 2010	3.5.11 Maintenance release.
3 October 2010	3.5.12 Maintenance release.
1 November 2011	3.5.13 Maintenance release.
12 October 2012	3.5.13.1 Maintenance release.
21 July 2013	3.5.13.2 SRU release
14.0.x
16 December 2014	14.0.0 release
30 August 2015	14.0.1 release
28 November 2015	14.0.2 release
28 February 2016	14.0.3 release
7 November 2016	14.0.4 release
18 August 2018	14.0.5 release
30 March 2019	14.0.6 release
30 December 2019	14.0.7 release
29 April 2020	14.0.8 release
1 November 2020	14.0.9 release
30 April 2021	14.0.10 release
31 October 2021	14.0.11 release
1 May 2022	14.0.12 release
30 Oct 2022	14.0.13 release
14.1.x
30 April 2023	14.1.0 release
29 October 2023	14.1.1 release
28 April 2024	14.1.2 release
27 October 2024	14.1.3 release
27 April 2025	14.1.4 release
9 November 2025	14.1.5 release
26 April 2026	14.1.6 release
01 November 2026	14.1.7 release
