= Q4OS =

Lightweight Linux distribution based on Debian

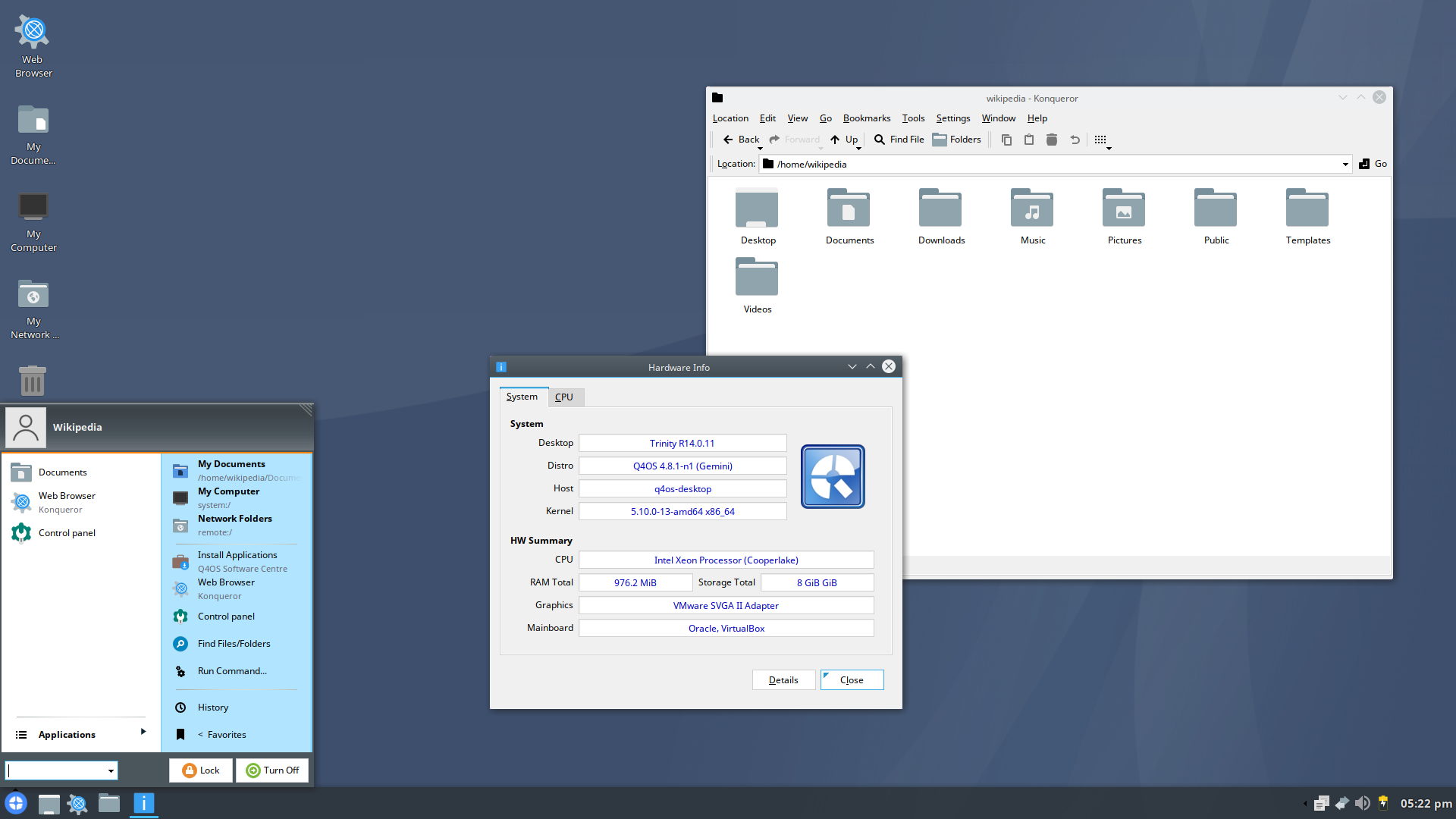
- Q4OS 4.8 (Gemini) running the Trinity Desktop Environment version R14.0.11
- Developer: Q4OS development team
- OS family: Unix-like
- Working state: Current
- Source model: Open source
- Initial release: 0.5.0 / 4 July 2013; 13 years ago
- Latest release: 6.1 / 12 September 2025; 13 months ago
- Available in: Multilingual
- Update method: APT
- Package manager: dpkg
- Supported platforms: x86-64, i386, armhf, arm64
- Kernel type: Linux kernel
- Userland: GNU
- Default user interface: TDE, KDE Plasma
- License: Free software licenses (mainly GPL) + some proprietary
- Official website: q4os.org

Q4OS is a light-weight Linux distribution based on Debian, targeted as a replacement for operating systems that are no longer supported on outdated hardware. The distribution is known for an addon called XPQ4, which adds themes intended to replicate the look and feel of Windows 2000, XP, 7, 8 and 10.

== History ==
Development of Q4OS began in 8 April 2014 to coincide with Windows XP's end of extended support in the same year.

LXQt Desktop Environment was included from April 2014 to June 2015.

In 2018 TDE (Trinity Desktop Environment) was included.

In 2019, version 3.8 was released which was based on Debian Buster.

As of April 2020, the core developers of Q4OS, initially starting the project in Germany, are now operating in Prague, Czech Republic.

== Features ==
It comes with either the Trinity Desktop Environment, which is a fork of K Desktop Environment 3, or KDE Plasma 6.

LookSwitcher, which lets the user switch visual themes

Desktop Profiler, which automatically installs some packages and programs that may be ideal for the user according to the profile they choose

Q4OS Software Centre, which lets the user install some recommended packages and programs from a list

Q4OS Welcome Screen, which helps the user with some initial tweaks

== Releases ==
Stable versions of Q4OS are derived from Debian's Stable release branch with long-term support that last five years after their initial release. Developmental "testing" versions of future releases are derived from the Debian Testing branch.

Version	Codename	Release date	End-of-life	Description
0.5.0		2013-07-04		Initial Release
1.1-RC2		2015-04-14		Second release candidate of Q4OS 1.1
1.2	Orion	2015-04-27		Initial version to be specified under codename Orion
1.2.3	Orion	2015-06-08		The LXQt desktop environment is now supported
1.4	Orion	2015-09-04		Initial version to support devices running on ARM architecture
1.6.3	Orion	2016-08-05		Implemented UEFI support
1.8.4	Orion	2017-04-26		Icedove is replaced with Mozilla Thunderbird, LXQt is unsupported
2.0.2	Scorpion	2016-01-06		Initial testing version of Q4OS Scorpion
2.3.6	Scorpion	2017-10-04		"Final beta" release
2.4	Scorpion	2017-10-04	2022-10	Initial stable release of Q4OS Scorpion and to provide long-term support
2.5	Scorpion	2018-06-03	2023-06	TDE is now bundled with KDE Plasma 5
3.1	Centaurus	2018-01-29		Initial testing version of Q4OS Centaurus
3.8	Centaurus	2019-07-15	2024-07	Initial stable release of Q4OS Centaurus
3.10	Centaurus	2020-01-04	2025-01	TDE and KDE Plasma have been split into separate installation images
3.13	Centaurus	2020-12-19	2025-12	The Snap daemon has been removed from default installation
4.0	Gemini	2020-02-16		Initial testing version of Q4OS Gemini
4.6	Gemini	2021-09-27	2026-09	Initial stable release of Q4OS Gemini
4.7	Gemini	2021-11-22	2026-11	
4.8	Gemini	2022-04-05	2027-04	
4.10	Gemini	2022-08-01	2027-08	
4.11	Gemini	2022-12-24	2027-08	
4.12	Gemini	2023-05-03	2027-08	Calamares installer has been polished
5.0	Aquarius	2023-03-27		Initial testing version of Q4OS Aquarius
5.2	Aquarius	2023-07-08	2028-06	Initial stable release of Q4OS Aquarius
5.3	Aquarius	2023-10-14	2028-06	
5.4	Aquarius	2023-11-28	2028-06	
5.5	Aquarius	2024-07-08	2028-06	
5.6	Aquarius	2024-09-04	2028-06	
5.7	Aquarius	2024-11-14	2028-06	
5.8	Aquarius	2025-03-27	2028-06	
6.1	Andromeda	2025-09-12	2030-08	
Legend: Unsupported Supported Latest version Preview version Future version

== Reception ==
SourceForge featured Q4OS as "Community Choice" Project of the Month in April 2020.

In January 2022, TechRadar considered Q4OS as one of the best light-weight Linux distributions of the year for its Windows installer and support for older hardware, notably systems running on 32-bit processors.

== Forks ==
=== Quarkos ===
Quarkos (formerly known as Quark) is an official fork of Q4OS that uses an Ubuntu base instead of Debian. It describes itself as a 'user-friendly, desktop oriented operating system based on Ubuntu Linux'. It comes in two variants, one of which uses the same desktop theme as Q4OS, while the other uses a visual theme similar to Windows 10.

==== Quark 20.04 ====
Quark 20.04 'Focal' was the first release, coming with the same base as Ubuntu 20.04. It was released on 25 September 2020, featuring only the KDE Plasma 5 desktop. On 3 November 2020, the development team announced that Microsoft Edge was now available for Linux, and users of Quark would be able to install it by downloading a .esh file from the Q4OS GitHub repository.

Quark 20.04.4, released 24 September 2021 added bugfixes from upstream Kubuntu. On 9 October 2021, the development team announced the general availability of the Windows installer for Quark 20.04 Focal.

Quark 20.04.5 was made available on 28 November 2021, bringing bugfixes from Kubuntu and Trinity desktop environment R14.0.11. An updated version of the Quark installer for Windows was released on 2 February 2022.

Quark 20.04.6 brought security bugfixes from upstream Kubuntu.

==== Quark 21.10 ====
Quark 21.10 'Impish' testing was announced on 9 October 2021, based on Kubuntu 21.10 and tools backported from Q4OS 4 'Gemini'. It was released with a stable version on 18 October 2021, with KDE Plasma 5.22 by default and the Windows and Q4OS themed variants. It also came with another edition with the Trinity 14.0.11 desktop backported from Q4OS. Quark 21.10 was supported until 2 August 2022, following the end of support for Ubuntu 21.10.

==== Quarkos 22.04 ====
Quarkos 22.04 'Jammy' was released on 24 August 2022, based on Ubuntu 22.04 LTS and Plasma 5.24. It will be supported until at least April 2027.

Quarkos 22.04 changes the branding from simply Quark to Quarkos, bringing separate installation media for the Trinity desktop, which has been updated to R14.0.12, but with the KDE Plasma edition as the default.

Quarkos 22.04.5 and 22.04.6 were released on 29 December 2022 and 27 February 2023 respectively, each bringing security updates and bugfixes from upstream Ubuntu.

Quarkos 22.04.7 was released on 19 March 2023, and brought updates from the latest release of Ubuntu 22.04. It also replaced much of the Q4OS branding with its own, including artwork, logos and branding integrated into the system. The source code was made available on the Q4OS project GitHub.

Quarkos 22.04-r8, released on 23 June 2023, brought the newest patches from Ubuntu 22.04 and Q4OS. It improves the Debonaire Plasma theme, updates the Trinity Desktop Environment to version 14.1.1 and includes fixes for the Trinity audio system.

=== FreeXP ===
FreeXP is a system based on Q4OS which included XPQ4. Users can set up the system using a .esh file to install the full set of features, or a live installer with the changes already made. The purpose of the project is to provide an 'XP Simulation'. The standalone project has merged with the XPQ4 project, where users can download FreeXP, XPQ4 installer for the Plasma or Trinity desktop, and 'Free10', a project similar to FreeXP but emulating Windows 10.

== See also ==
- Comparison of light-weight Linux distributions
- Trinity Desktop Environment
- ReactOS
- Linux XP
