= Matthias Kalle Dalheimer =

Swedish author (born 1970)

- Born: 27 May 1970 (age 56)
- Occupations: President and CEO
- Employer: Klarälvdalens Datakonsult AB
- Known for: KDE and author
- Website: www.kdab.com

Matthias Kalle Dalheimer (born 27 May 1970) is a published author and software consultant from Sweden. He ported the StarOffice office suite to Linux and he was one of KDE's first contributors. In August 2002 he was elected as president of KDE e.V.

== Career ==
Dalheimer founded Klarälvdalens Datakonsult AB, the first technical solution provider of Qt Development Frameworks, where he is the current president & CEO and Head of Development.

== Books ==
Matthias Kalle Dalheimer has written several books on the subject of Qt and Linux

- "Running Linux, A Distribution-Neutral Guide for Servers and Desktops", by Matthias Kalle Dalheimer and Matt Welsh
  - Publisher: O'Reilly Media
  - Print ISBN 978-0-596-00760-7
  - Review,Free Software Magazine 2 March 2006
- "Programming with Qt, Writing Portable GUI applications on Unix and Win32", by Matthias Kalle Dalheimer
  - Publisher: O'Reilly Media
  - Print ISBN 978-0-596-00064-6
