= HSwMS Sirius =

HSwMS Sirius is the name of the following ships of the Swedish Navy:

- HSwMS Sirius (1903), a 1.-class torpedo boat
- HSwMS Sirius (T122), a Spica-class torpedo boat launched in 1966 and decommissioned in 1985

== See also ==
- Sirius (disambiguation)
