= Garuda Linux =

Arch-derived Linux distribution

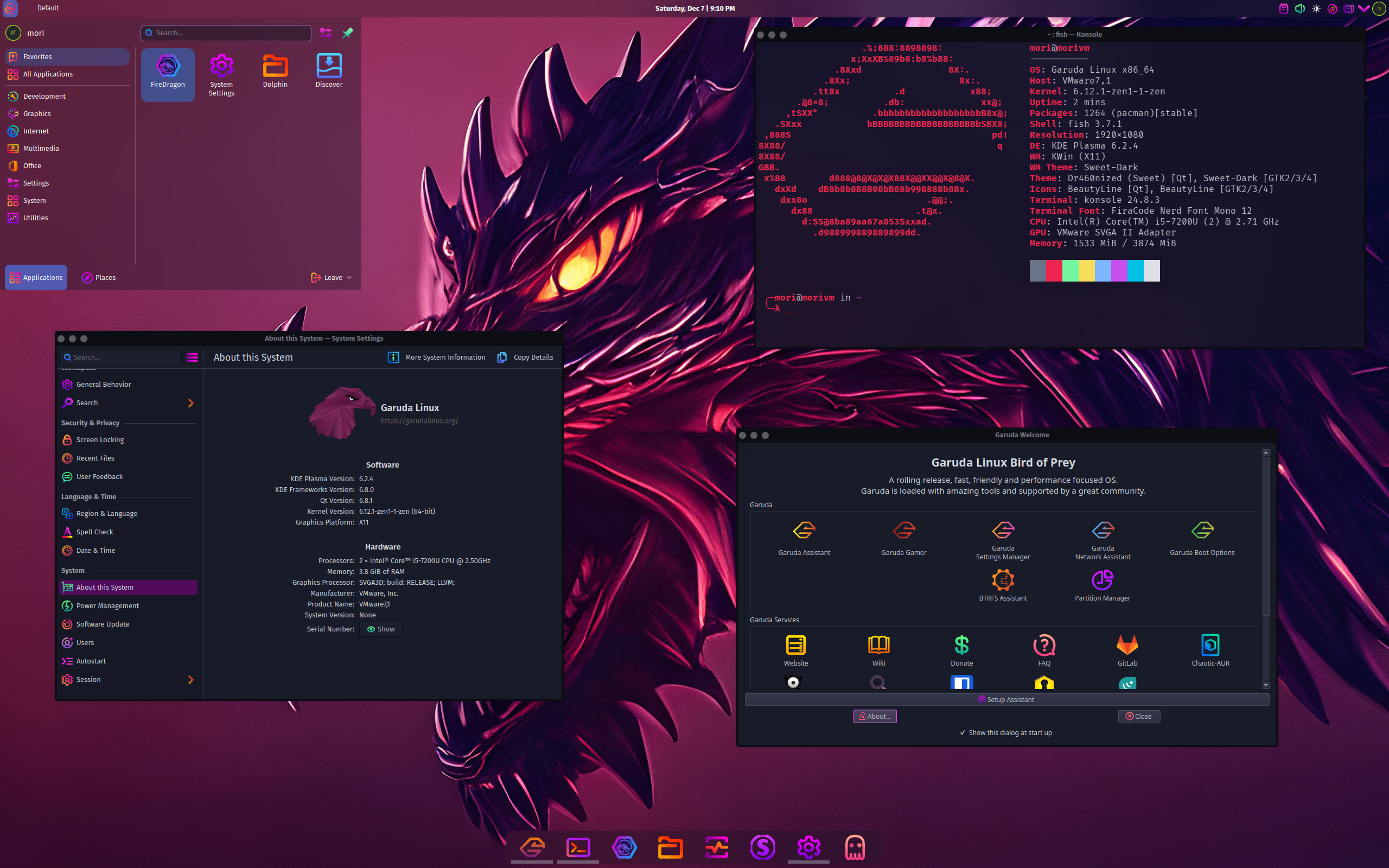
- Garuda Linux Dr460nized, "Bird of Prey"
- Developer: SGS, Shrinivas Vishnu Kumbhar (Librewish), tbg, dr460nf1r3 (Nico), Yorper, Naman Garg, Filo, TNE, Πέτρος (Petsam), Dalto, Zoeruda, Eduard Tolosa, Ankur Kumar
- Written in: C, C++, Python, D, Java
- OS family: Linux (Unix-like)
- Working state: Current
- Source model: Open-source
- Initial release: 26 March 2020; 6 years ago
- Latest release: Rolling release / 8 March 2025; 20 months ago
- Repository: gitlab.com/garuda-linux
- Available in: Over 50 languages
- Package manager: Pacman
- Kernel type: Monolithic (Linux Kernel)
- Default user interface: KDE Plasma (Note: Garuda Linux also offers, Cinnamon, GNOME, Deepin, XFCE, i3, and Hyprland.)
- License: Various
- Official website: garudalinux.org

Garuda Linux is an Arch Linux-based Linux distribution It offers multiple desktop environments, but the KDE Plasma version is the default. The distribution is named after Garuda, the divine eagle mount of the god Vishnu in Hinduism.

Garuda Linux features a rolling release update model using Pacman as its package manager.

== History ==
Garuda Linux was released on 26 March 2020 by Shrinivas Vishnu Kumbhar, a university student from India, and SGS from Germany.

== Features ==
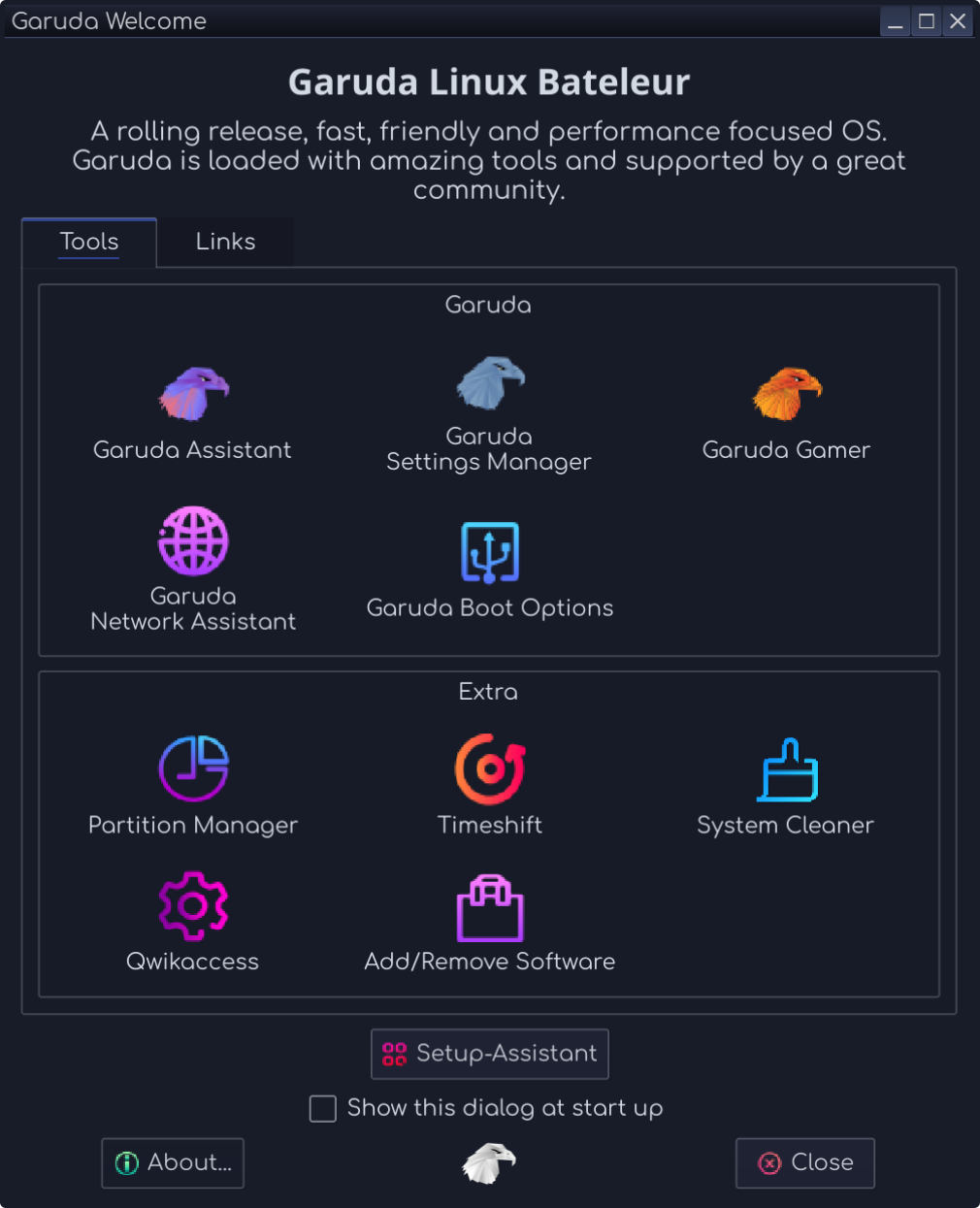
Garuda Linux Welcome Page

The operating system provides GUIs for all operations, instead of focusing on the command line like Arch Linux. Garuda Linux installation process is done with Calamares, a graphical installer. The bootloader used is GRUB. The distribution uses the btrfs file system by default which supports snapshots. The snapshots can be accessed from the bootloader and support compression. Garuda includes Manjaro's pamac GUI frontend for Pacman that allows for the installation of packages from pacman, Snap, and Flatpak packages. Support for the AUR is provided by Chaotic-AUR. The command line can also be used. It also includes Garuda Settings Manager, a program for system settings such as the kernel, and Garuda Assistant for changing admin settings. The main theme of Garuda Linux is a custom KDE Plasma theme known as Dr460nized (dragonized) which resembles a stylized macOS.

Garuda Linux includes Garuda Gamer, a GUI offering easy installation of gaming related packages.

The rolling release model results in all system software components getting updated during normal software updates, instead of waiting for major operating system version updates.

== See also ==
- List of Linux distributions § Pacman-based
