= OpenDesktop.org =

Online cloud service

Opendesktop.org

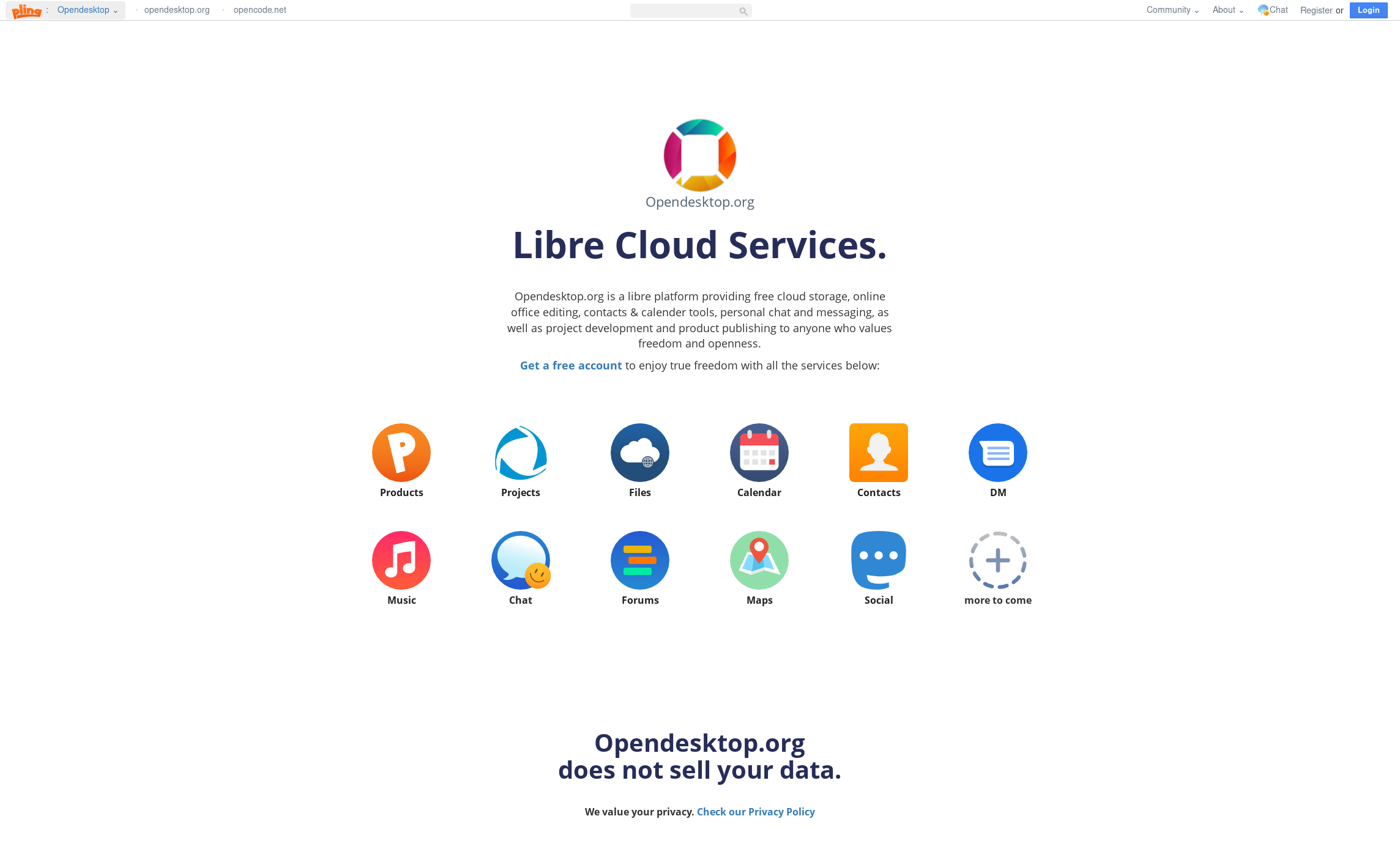
- Opendesktop.org homepage
- Website type: Libre services and content sharing
- Owner: Hive01 GmbH
- Creator: Frank Karlitschek
- Website: https://www.opendesktop.org/
- Commercial: No (AGPL released server-code)
- Registration: Optional
- Launched: 2001
- Current status: Under maintenance

Opendesktop.org is a website portal offering personal cloud services such as storage and communication services, as well as public services in form of a store for libre (open source/creative commons) content publishing and a code hosting site for open development.

== Features ==
=== Main Site ===
The goal of OpenDesktop.org is the advancement of free software and libre computing technologies via hosting free-as-in-freedom-and-beer services for the community.

==== Opendesktop.org Personal Services ====
As of 2019, Opendesktop offers many free alternatives to proprietary services, like file sharing, contact and calendar management, chat, and messaging. All of these services are based on free or libre software components, like Nextcloud, Discourse, or Element (a Matrix client).

=== Pling.com ===
A major part of OpenDesktop.org's services is pling.com. It is a website used for sharing user generated content. It allows the publishing of any kind of libre content such as themes, wallpapers, software applications, and add-ons, as well as other creative content like audio, videos, or comics, provided the content is released under liberal licensing terms like the GPL or Creative Commons. This content can then be downloaded or directly installed without registration or any other limitation or cost. Registered users can upvote or downvote content, add comments, and upload new content such as applications, themes, add-ons or other forms of content. Community members can also decide to sponsor certain content with a monthly donation. Opendesktop.org's Pling is one of the largest online communities for making such content available, serving as the platform for the official KDE Store for KDE themes, widgets, and other customization-related items. Other sites for various Linux desktops are organized in sub-groups such as Gnome-Look.org, Xfce-Look.org, and others.

==== Supporting via Donations ====
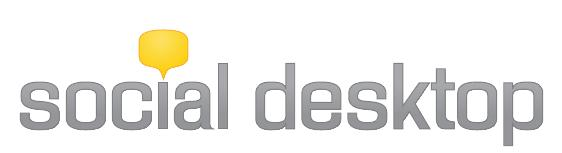
Social Desktop logo

The social community aspect of the portal has been a driving factor early on. According to the project site, a dedicated community is a key factor to improve the quality of open source and to ultimately grow the adoption of the Linux desktop. One primary goal for Pling is to encourage free software users to support the various subgroups and creators on the platform via donations.

==== OCS API ====
Pling.com uses the Open Collaboration Services API, shortened as the OCS API, which is a certified standard protocol of freedesktop.org. KDE SC 4 was the first project to make use of the OCS API. KDE Plasma 5 and various KDE applications use the OCS API via the KNewStuff framework.

=== Opencode.net ===
Opencode.net is a part of the services offered by Opendesktop.org, providing software development and hosting services. It is based on GitLab, with the possibility to build binaries via CI and integrate any project with Opendesktop's publishing service, Pling.com.

== Growth and statistics ==
In the beginning of December 2001, 2,000 users were registered on the various websites. About 0.8 million page impressions per month were made. A year later, in 2002, there were 6,000 registered users and 3 million page impressions each month. Heavy growth for more than 8 years lead to more than 130,000 registered users from over 100 countries in 2009. Over 90 million page impressions per month are reached with more than 6 terabytes of internet traffic per month. Around 2.5 million people visit Opendesktop.org every month.

== History ==
The first website of the portal, KDE-Look.org, was started in the year 2001 by Frank Karlitschek. Shortly after, many similar sites with focus on other open source themes and customization for other Linux desktops, such as GNOME, were launched. In 2007, Opendesktop.org got established as an umbrella page for the whole network that contains the sites such as Xfce-Look.org, GNOME-Look.org or Linux-Apps.com. These services now continue on their own dedicated page, along with the content also being available on pling.com.
In January 2016, Frank Karlitschek sold Hive01 GmbH to Blue Systems GmbH.
