= Tuxedo Computers =

Computer manufacturer using free software

Tuxedo Computers GmbH
- Type: Private
- Industry: Computer hardware Computer software
- Founded: February 2004, 01; 22 years ago
- Founder: Herbert Feiler
- Headquarters: Augsburg, Germany
- Area served: Worldwide
- Key people: Herbert Feiler (CEO)
- Products: Desktops, laptops, servers
- Number of employees: 50
- Website: www.tuxedocomputers.com

Tuxedo Computers GmbH (stylised as TUXEDO Computers) is a computer manufacturer based in Augsburg, Germany. The company specializes in desktop computers and laptops with a pre-installed Linux operating system. The devices are manufactured in Leipzig, Germany. Tuxedo Computers equips its devices with Tuxedo OS, its own Linux distribution based on Ubuntu, or installs a selection of distributions as well as Microsoft Windows as an operating system in parallel with the Linux system or in a virtual machine.

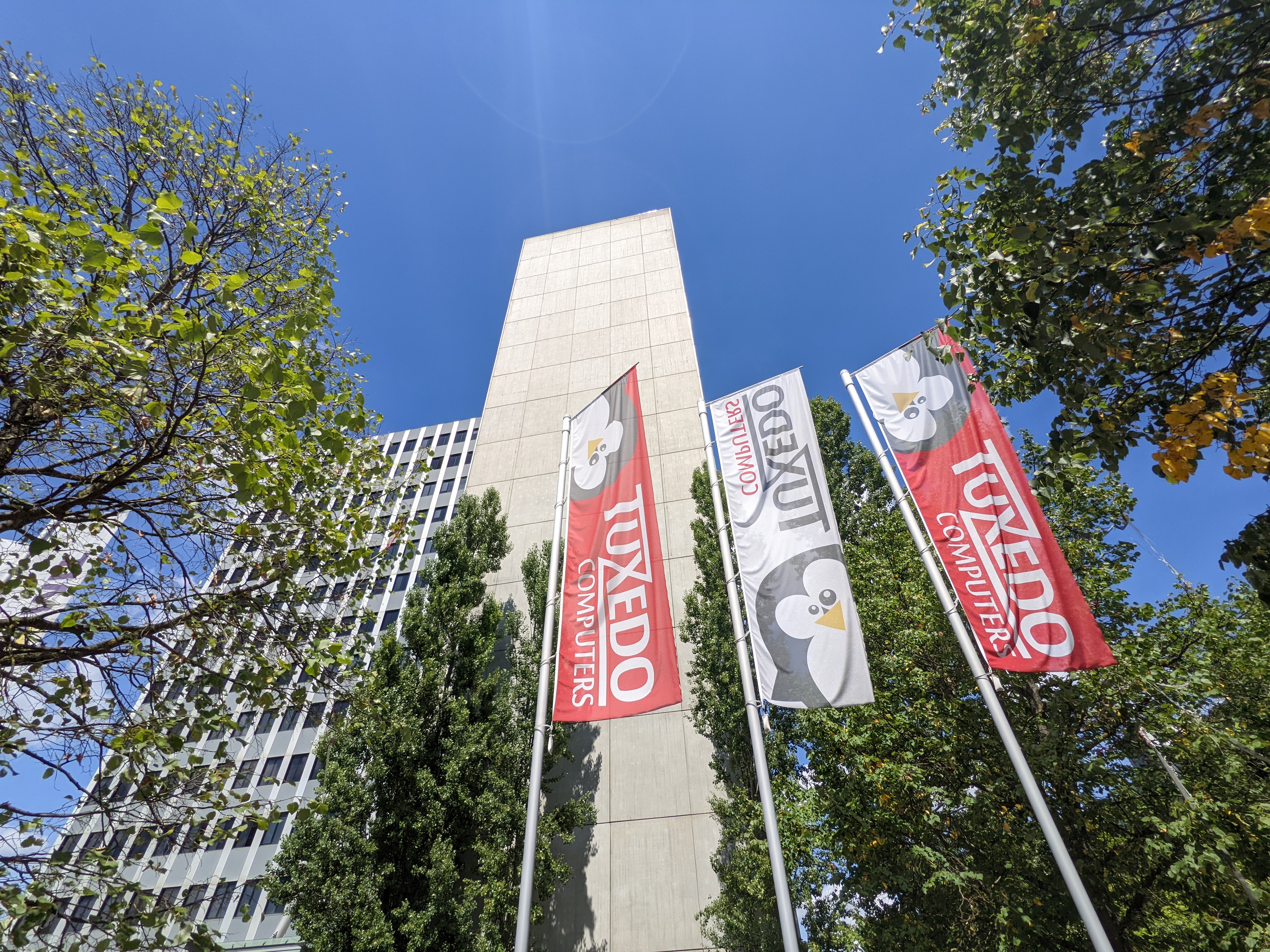
Corporate headquarters in Augsburg's BüroCenter Messe (2023).

== History ==
Tuxedo Computers was founded on February 1, 2004, by current managing director Herbert Feiler in Bayreuth. In 2013, the company moved to Königsbrunn. In 2019 followed another move to the current headquarters in Augsburg. The name derives from the Linux mascot Tux, whose feathers resemble a tuxedo. The company emerged from an online store that specialized in the distribution of promotional items related to Linux and open-source software and software boxes with Linux distributions.

Due to better Linux compatibility, TUXEDO Computers originally only carried desktop computers, as notebooks often required special adaptations. In the meantime, notebooks and small form factor desktop computers complement the range. The names of the devices borrow from stars and planets, space travel, and science and technology.

== Tuxedo OS ==
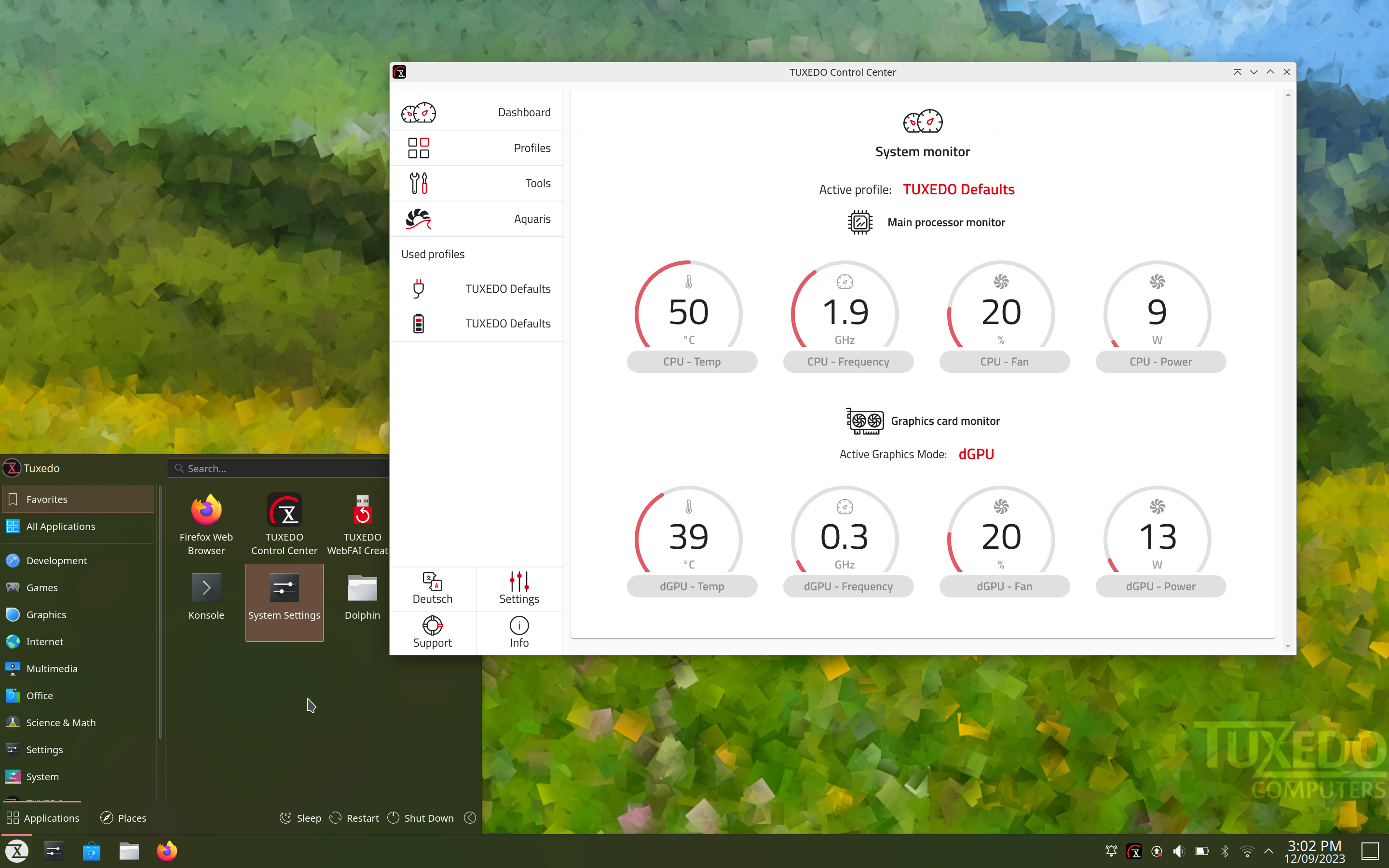
Tuxedo OS 2 with the Tuxedo Control Center.

With Tuxedo OS (stylized as TUXEDO OS), Tuxedo Computers develops its own Linux distribution based on Ubuntu. The first version was released on September 29, 2022. Compared to Ubuntu, Tuxedo OS comes without the package management Snap initiated by Canonical and adds the latest Linux kernel and the latest version of KDE Plasma. In addition, Tuxedo OS uses its own software repositories operated by hosting providers located in Germany and refrains from phoning home. Tuxedo OS can be freely downloaded from the project page in the form of an ISO disk image file.

In July 2026, Tuxedo Computers announced that Tuxedo OS will be based on Debian testing instead of Ubuntu.

Complementing Tuxedo OS, the company is working on tools to control hardware functions and improve usability. Licensed under the GNU General Public License, the Tuxedo Control Center allows, among other things, the control and management of fans, the clocking of the central and graphics processing unit or the adjustment of the backlit keyboard of Tuxedo laptops. With the WebFAI, Tuxedo Computers releases its in-house tool to automatically install computers running Tuxedo OS or other Linux distributions.

== Community relations ==
Tuxedo Computers is one of the Patrons of KDE and also supports the KDE developers with the possibility to organize events. For example, the KDE Plasma Sprint 2023 was held at the company's offices. The Linux User Group Augsburg meets regularly on its premises. Developers from Tuxedo Computers regularly submit code and patches to the Linux kernel.

== MyTuxedo ==
Under the name MyTuxedo, Tuxedo Computers operates a cloud storage service based on Nextcloud. The offer is currently only available to buyers of a Tuxedo computer. The servers as well as the backup storage are located in data centers in Germany, the service is therefore subject to the European General Data Protection Regulation.

== See also ==
- Linux adoption
- Framework Computer
- Purism (company)
- System76
