= Antergos =

Discontinued Linux distribution based on Arch Linux

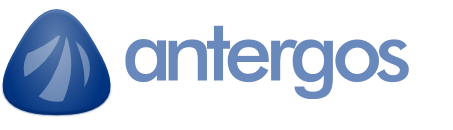

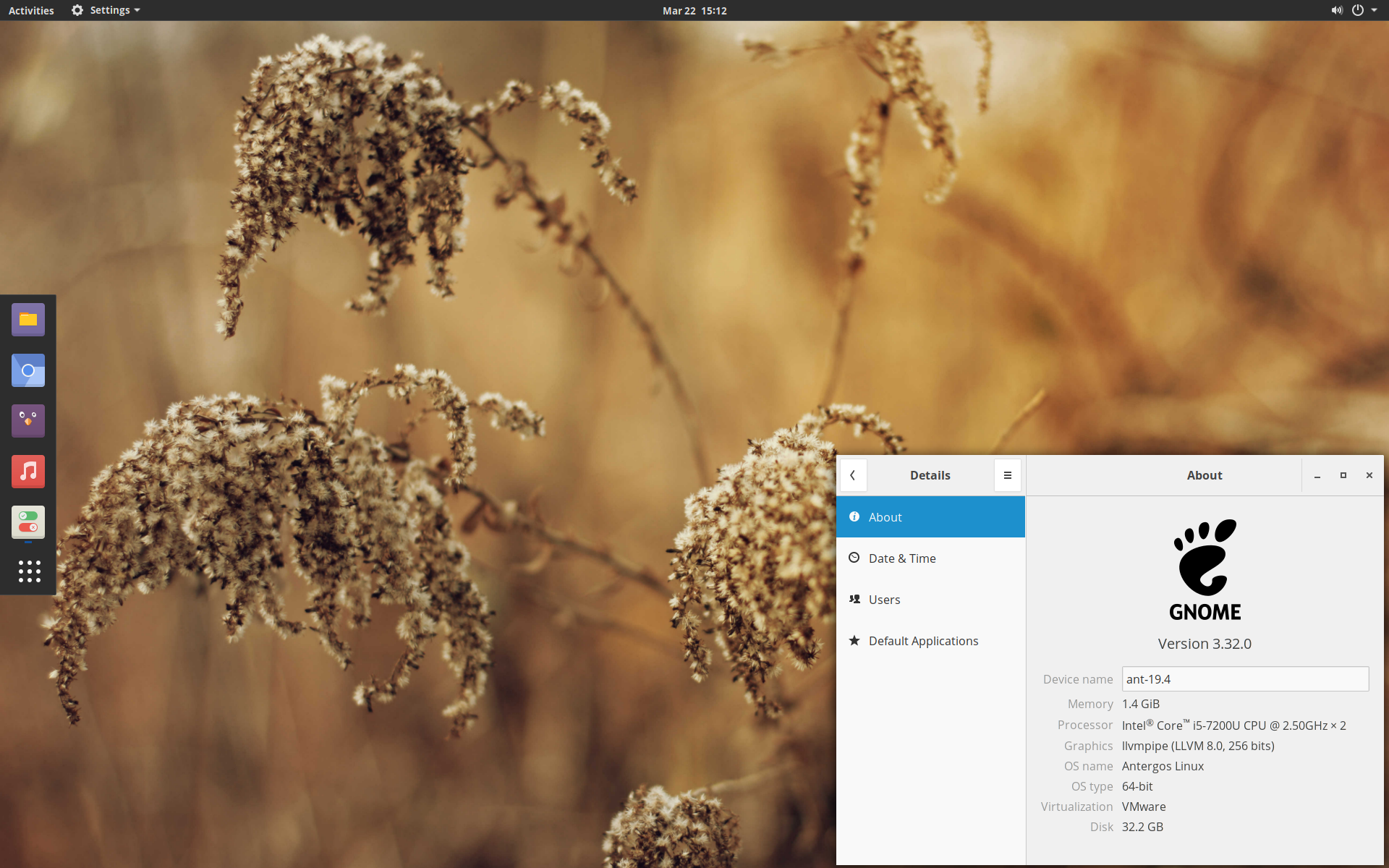
- Antergos 19.4 screenshot with GNOME 3
- Developer: Alexandre Filgueira and team
- OS family: Linux (Unix-like)
- Working state: Discontinued
- Source model: Open source
- Initial release: 7 May 2012; 14 years ago
- Final release: 19.4 / 4 April 2019; 7 years ago
- Package manager: Pacman
- Supported platforms: x86-64
- Kernel type: Monolithic (Linux)
- Default user interface: GNOME Shell, Cinnamon, Xfce, Command-line, Plasma 5, Openbox, MATE, deepin
- License: Mostly GNU GPL and various other free software licenses, with a few proprietary components such as Flash Player
- Succeeded by: EndeavourOS
- Official website: https://antergos.com/ at the Wayback Machine (archived 2019-09-03)

Antergos is a discontinued Linux distribution based on Arch Linux. By default, it includes the GNOME desktop environment, but it also offers options for Cinnamon, MATE, KDE Plasma 5, Deepin, and Xfce desktops. Originally released in July 2012 as Cinnarch, it quickly gained popularity and was ranked among the top 40 most popular distributions on DistroWatch by June 2013. The name Antergos derived from the Galician word for ancestors, was chosen "to link the past with the present".

Development of Antergos was discontinued on 21 May 2019, due to the limited availability of time for the volunteer developers. It was succeeded by EndeavourOS, which was released on 15 July 2019.

== History and development ==
Initially the project began as Cinnarch and the desktop environment used by this distribution was Cinnamon, a fork of GNOME Shell developed by the Linux Mint team. In April 2013 the team adopted GNOME for future releases, beginning with GNOME version 3.6, due to the difficulty of keeping Cinnamon (which did not make it a priority to stay compatible with the latest GTK libraries) in the repositories of a rolling release like Arch Linux. The distribution was accordingly renamed to Antergos and released under the new name in May 2013.

Other changes in the default configuration of the system included: Nautilus replacing the Nemo file manager, GDM replacing MDM (Mint Display Manager) as the desktop manager and Empathy replacing Pidgin as the messaging client.

Starting with version 2014.05.26, Antergos partnered with the Numix project to bring Numix-Square icons and an exclusive Numix-Frost theme to the operating system.

On 7 March 2015, an Antergos Minimal ISO was made available, providing only necessary components for the installer to function.

On 21 May 2019, the developers announced the end of development for the project, citing lack of time to work on it. They explained, "Today, we are announcing the end of this project. As many of you probably noticed over the past several months, we no longer have enough free time to properly maintain Antergos. We came to this decision because we believe that continuing to neglect the project would be a huge disservice to the community. Taking this action now, while the project’s code still works, provides an opportunity for interested developers to take what they find useful and start their own projects."

The developers indicated that existing users will cease getting Antergos updates, eventually the Antergos repositories will be removed via an update and users will be left essentially running Arch Linux. The forums and wiki page were to be maintained for a maximum of three further months. As of 27 May 2020, their website is offline.

Successors to the Antergos project include EndeavourOS and Antergos NeXT, the latter a modern revival featuring the KDE Plasma desktop environment and dinit as the default init system, as opposed to the original's systemd.

== Installation ==
Antergos includes the Cnchi graphical installer, which boots into a GNOME desktop environment, but during installation gives the user the option to choose between GNOME 3, Cinnamon, Mate, KDE Plasma 5, Xfce, deepin and Openbox desktop environments. A network connection is required to begin the installation and to automatically update the Cnchi installer prior to installation.

== Package management ==
Antergos releases operated on a rolling release schedule and utilized the Arch Linux official repositories and the AUR, along with Antergos's own software repositories. It was a Pacman-based distribution with a graphical installer.

Antergos by default does not include an office suite. However, since the earliest Cinnarch release, it has included the "LibreOffice Installer for Arch Linux" which makes it easy to select and download the required LibreOffice components.

== Releases ==
The first ISO by the name of Cinnarch was launched on 7 May 2012, accompanied by a message in the Arch Linux forum notifying users of the release. The first version under the Antergos name was released on 12 May 2013.

== See also ==
- EndeavourOS
- Comparison of Linux distributions
- List of Linux distributions
