= Blue Systems =

German IT company

- Type: GmbH
- Industry: Free software
- Founder: Clemens Tönnies, Jr.
- Headquarters: Bielefeld, Germany
- Area served: Worldwide
- Products: Maui; Netrunner; openDesktop.org; Previously: Kubuntu
- Owner: Clemens Tönnies, Jr.
- Website: blue-systems.com

Blue Systems is a German IT company. It is most prominent as a major KDE supporter and previous driving force behind Kubuntu with a number of KDE developers working for Blue Systems. According to Blue Systems employee Aurélien Gâteau, "Blue Systems does not have a business model, at least for now".

== Background ==
Blue Systems was founded by German businessman Clemens Tönnies Jr. He is a son of the deceased Bernd Tönnies who founded meat production heavyweight Tönnies Lebensmittel in 1971. Clemens Tönnies Jr. inherited 25% but left the company by transferring his shares to his brother Robert, who now owns 50% of Tönnies Lebensmittel. The other 50% are owned by Bernd's brother Clemens Tönnies Sr. who is also the chairman of FC Schalke 04's board of directors. Tönnies Lebensmittel generated 4.3 billion Euro revenue in 2011.

German IT website Golem.de did a feature about Tönnies Jr. in July 2012. According to the feature, Tönnies Jr. studied computer science, was 36 years old at the time of publication, and was described as a philanthropist.

== History ==
Blue Systems became first known as creator of Ubuntu/Kubuntu-based Linux distribution Netrunner whose first release was in March 2010.

In February 2012, Clement Lefebvre of Ubuntu/Kubuntu-based Linux Mint announced that Blue Systems would become a sponsor to help Mint's KDE edition.

After Canonical Ltd. stepped down as the main sponsor of Kubuntu in February 2012, Blue Systems stepped into that role in April 2012.

In 2012, Blue Systems gained more attention by hiring at least nine KDE developers. Among the hired KDE developers are former Canonical employees Jonathan Riddell and Aurélien Gâteau, who joined in April 2012, as well as long-time KWin developer Martin Grässlin who announced in October 2012 to switch to Blue Systems to work full-time on KWin beginning January 2013.

On 13 January 2016, openDesktop.org founder Frank Karlitschek announced that his company hive01 GmbH along with openDesktop.org and related web sites has been bought by Blue Systems. Later that year, in September 2016, KDE e.V. announced that the former openDesktop.org site "kde-look.org" now operates under KDE's umbrella as KDE Store, operated by Blue Systems’ “sister company” Pling GmbH.
