= Frank Karlitschek =

German software programmer

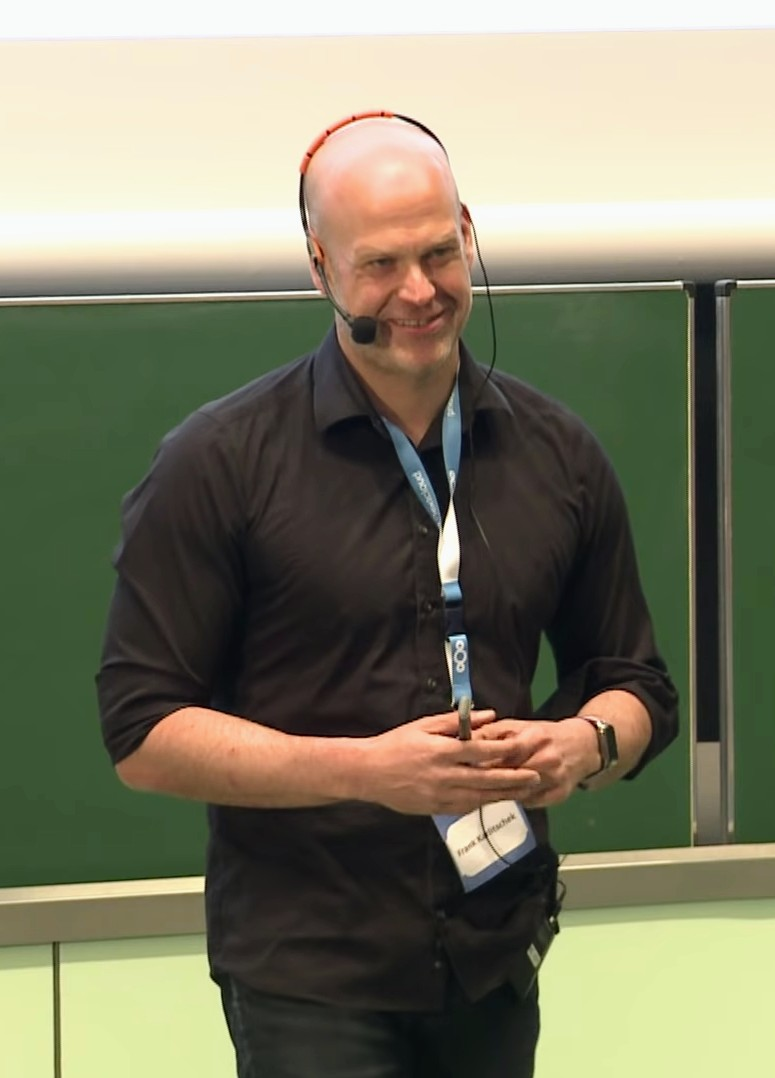
- Karlitschek in 2018
- Born: 25 July 1973 (age 53); Reutlingen, Germany
- Occupation: open source developer
- Known for: ownCloud, Nextcloud, KDE contributor and KDE e.V. vice president
- Website: karlitschek.de

Frank Karlitschek (born 25 July 1973) is a German open source software developer living in Stuttgart, Germany.

Karlitschek argues on his blog that "Privacy is the foundation of democracy." He says that people should have a basic right "to control their own data in the Internet age."

== Free software ==
Karlitschek is a KDE contributor since 2001 when he mainly worked in web community and artist team. He is a member of the KDE e.V. since 2003. In summer 2009 he was elected as a board member and vice president of KDE e.V.

In 2001, Karlitschek started KDE-Look.org. At Akademy 2008, Karlitschek presented the vision of the Social Desktop for the KDE project. Karlitschek further started the Open-PC and the Open Collaboration Services projects. He is also a cohost of RadioTux, the biggest German Linux Podcast. In 2012, Karlitschek started the User Data Manifesto initiative.

Karlitschek gives keynotes at conferences like LinuxCon, Latinoware, openSUSE Conf, and Akademy.

== ownCloud ==
In 2010, Karlitschek started the ownCloud project during a CampKDE keynote and released the version 1.0 in June 2010. He was the project leader and maintainer.

In 2011, Karlitschek co-founded ownCloud Inc. to offer an enterprise version of ownCloud. He served as the CTO and oversaw the product development and community relations.

In April 2016, Karlitschek left ownCloud Inc.

== Nextcloud ==
In June 2016, five weeks after leaving ownCloud, he started Nextcloud, a fork of ownCloud.
