= Sirius.B (band) =

American band

- Origin: Asheville, North Carolina, United States
- Genres: Gypsy punk World music Indie rock
- Years active: 2006–present
- Members: Pancho Romero Bond; Xavier Ferdón; Imhotep; Franklin Keel; Ryan Kijanka; Mattick Frick; Drayton Aldridge
- Past members: Lee Stanford; Bryshen Brothwell; Rachael Kistler; Amy Lovinger; Mike Morel; Rob Whitesides (A.K.A. Branco Cotes); Jamie Davis; Laura Baskervill; Hannah Furgiuele; Bruce Comings; Lauren Baker; Mike Oliver
- Website: www.siriusbmusic.com

Sirius.B is an eight-piece musical group from Asheville, nc. It was formed in late 2006 by Xavier Ferdón, Pancho Romero Bond, and Imhotep and takes its name from the white dwarf star, Sirius B. Sirius.B combines accordion, violin, cello, acoustic guitar, flamenco and electric guitar, charango, banjo, percussion, drums, upright bass, melodica, clarinet, and multi-lingual vocals to create a worldly or otherwise otherworldly sound.

In the Mountain Xpress's Best of Western North Carolina for 2017, Sirius.B was voted:

- No. 1 Favorite All-Around Band

In the Mountain Xpress's Best of Western North Carolina for 2015, Sirius.B was voted:

- No. 1 Favorite All-Around Band
- No. 3 Rock Band

In the Mountain Xpress's Best of Western North Carolina for 2014, Sirius.B was voted:

- No. 1 Favorite All-Around Band
- No. 1 Acoustic/Folk Band (tie)
- No. 1 Rock Band

In the Mountain Xpress's Best of Western North Carolina for 2013, Sirius.B was voted:

- No. 1 Favorite All-Around Band
- No. 1 Acoustic/Folk Band
- No. 1 Rock Band
- No. 3 World Music Band

In the Mountain Xpress's Best of Western North Carolina for 2012, Sirius.B was voted:

- No. 1 Favorite Local Band
- No. 1 Local Gypsy Absurdist Punk Rock Band
- No. 3 Local Band: Acoustic / Folk

In the Mountain Xpress's Best of Western North Carolina for 2011, Sirius.B was voted:

- No. 1 Next Big Thing
- No. 1 Local Band: Rock
- No. 2 Favorite Local Band
- No. 2 Local Band: Acoustic/Folk

In the Mountain Xpress's Best of Western North Carolina for 2010, Sirius.B was voted:

- No. 1 Next Big Thing
- No. 2 Experimental Band
- No. 2 Rock Band

In the Mountain Xpress's Best of Western North Carolina for 2009, Sirius.B was voted:

- No. 1 Rock Band
- No. 1 Experimental Band (tie)
- No. 2 Indie Band
- No. 3 Live Show of 2009 – (Beating Sirius.B for Best Live Show were the Beastie Boys and Phish.)

In addition, Sirius.B also won awards in the Best of WNC 2007 and Best of WNC 2008. Mountain Xpress writes, "folk-punk artists Sirius B are, according to Xpress readers, the ones to watch."

Sirius.B's songs can be heard on regional radio stations such as 88.7FM WNCW, 105.9FM The Mountain, 98.1FM The River, 880AM The Revolution, and Power 90.5FM. They have also made a live appearance on the WDVX Knoxville Blue Plate Special, which has hosted other artists such as Bela Fleck and The Avett Brothers.

In addition to the Asheville area, they tour regionally to venues in Atlanta and Athens, GA; Columbia and Charleston, SC; and Knoxville and Johnson City, TN. They often host ticket sales on their main website. The Mountain Xpress states that "The excitement of a Sirius.B show has been compared by the press to what 'one would imagine Athens’s 40 Watt Club to have been like in the early days of R.E.M."

Their original album, "Dazzling Urbanites" was released on May 3, 2008.

Their second album, "Monkey Robot Soldier" was released on March 27, 2010.

Their third album, "The Triumphant Return of Black-Eyed Norman" was recorded at Echo Mountain Recording Studio and released on September 28, 2012, after raising $9,150 through their Kickstarter campaign.

== Line-up ==
=== Current members ===
- Pancho Romero Bond – Vocals, Acoustic guitar, Kazoo
- Xavier Ferdón – Guitar, Chromatic button accordion, Charango, Banjo
- Imhotep - Percussion
- Franklin Keel – Cello, Vocals
- Mattick Frick – Percussion, Vocals
- Ryan Kijanka – Upright bass, Vocals
- Drayton Aldridge – Violin

In the Asheville Symphony Orchestra Franklin Keel is the Assistant Principal Cellist.

Franklin Keel is also a member of Upland Drive and the Opal String Quartet.

Ryan Kijanka is a member of Upland Drive.

=== Former members ===
- Lauren Baker - Vocals
- Brian Hermanson – Clarinet
- Lee Stanford – Violin, Vocals
- Bryshen Brothwell – Accordion, Upright Bass, Piano
- Rachael Kistler – Violin
- Amy Lovinger – Violin
- Mike Morel – Percussion
- Branco Cotes – Percussion
- Jamie Davis – Bass Guitar
- Laura Baskervill – Violin
- Hannah Furgiuele – Violin, Viola
- Bruce Comings – Bass Guitar

=== Special guests ===
- Christian Newman (tenor) – Vocals
- Martha Gardner – Violin
- Mariya Potapova – Violin
- Kara Poorbaugh – Viola
- Debra Darling – Vocals
- Ralph McGibbons - Vocals
- Todd Scholl, aka FrostyG – Vocals
- Seth Kellam – Vocals

=== Discography ===
- Stars and the Fishes (2017)
- Monkey Robot Soldier (2010)
- Dazzling Urbanites (2008)
- The Triumphant Return of Black-Eyed Norman (2012)
