= KDE Plasma 6 =

2024 desktop environment

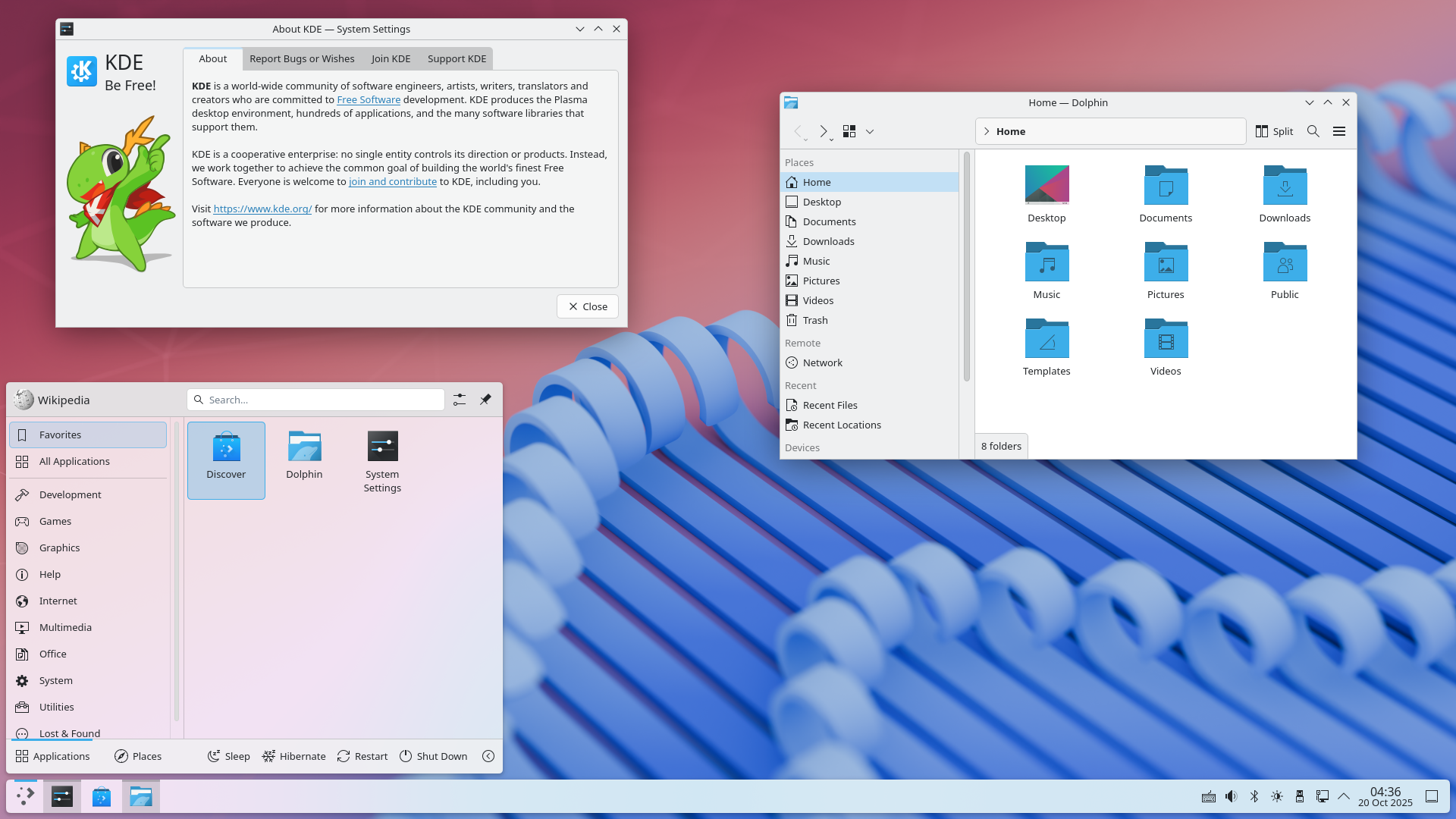
- The KDE Plasma 6 desktop
- Developer: KDE
- Release: 28 February 2024; 2 years ago
- Stable release: 6.8.3 / 10 November 2026; 2 days ago
- Preview release: N/A
- Written in: C++, QML
- Operating system: Unix-like
- Platform: FreeBSD, OpenBSD and Linux
- Predecessor: KDE Plasma 5
- Type: Desktop environment
- License: GPL 2.0 or later
- Website: kde.org/plasma-desktop
- Repository: invent.kde.org/plasma

KDE Plasma 6 is the sixth and most recent generation of the KDE Plasma desktop environment. It is the successor of KDE Plasma 5 and was first released on 28 February 2024.

== Overview ==
KDE Plasma 6 was designed not to be a major departure from KDE Plasma 5, but rather a series of improvements. KDE Plasma 6 is built using Qt 6, KDE Frameworks 6, and KDE Gear 24.02. In addition, support for the Wayland protocol was mainstreamed as the default graphical session, with X11 support made secondary. It introduces a new sound theme, Ocean, replacing Oxygen's as the default. Plasma 6 on Wayland has partial support for High Dynamic Range (HDR) and color blindness correction filters. The Discover app and settings were also improved, and the 3D cube desktop effect was brought back.

== New features ==
Compared to the latest Plasma 5 release, the sixth generation brings the following new features:

- The panel floats by default. Panels can be configured in auto-hide mode and resized, including being turned into a dock.
- Plasma Search allows you to customize the ordering of search results, supports time zone conversion, and matches text in both the current system language and English.
- Support for the Astronomical and Umm al-Qura Calendars in the calendar applet.
- Native support for the use of both password and fingerprint authentication at the same time.
- Support for sound themes.

== History ==
The first stable version of Plasma 6 was released on 28 February 2024.

=== Releases ===
As of 2025, major versions with new features are released every four months, with three updates per year. However, since 2023, the KDE community has expressed a preference to transition to a semi-annual schedule, with updates occurring every six months, if it can be timed to align with the release cycles of the major Linux distributions that package Plasma (Ubuntu, OpenSUSE Leap, and Fedora).

Each release receives up to six patch releases containing bug fixes. Releases will stop receiving bug fixes as soon as the next major release is available. Originally, there were no plans to offer a long-term support version of Plasma 6. However, on 13 August 2026, KDE Developer Nate Graham, his company Techpaladin Software, and Linux hardware vendor Kubuntu Focus announced that KDE Plasma 6.6, KDE Frameworks 6.24, and KDE Gear 25.12 would be receive bug fixes and security updates for three years after its initial release. This effort was funded by Kubuntu Focus, who sponsored Techpaladin Software under the "Bullet-Proof KDE Initiative" to allow for these security updates and bug fixes on these versions of KDE components. The Linux distro that would receive these updates directly was announced to be Kubuntu 26.04, an LTS version of Kubuntu used by Kubuntu Focus on their hardware, however, any fixes from this effort are not limited to Kubuntu or Kubuntu Focus customers.

Plasma 6 releases
Version	LTS	Date	Key features
6.0	No	28 Feb 2024	First release of KDE Plasma 6.0 (as part of the greater KDE MegaRelease 6)
6.1	No	18 Jun 2024	Remote desktop, better widget editing, persistent apps, and synchronizing keyboard LEDs with accent color.
6.2	No	8 Oct 2024	Drawing tablet calibration wizard and test mode, improved HDR support, support for PostmarketOS packages in Discover, and overhauled Accessibility page in System Settings.
6.3	No	11 Feb 2025	Improved drawing tablet settings page, overhauled fractional scaling, support for ICC color profiles in Night Light, improved hardware monitoring with added GPU statistics support on FreeBSD, and improved customization settings.
6.4	No	17 Jun 2025	Modernized KMenuEdit, improved Discover feedback, enhanced accessibility in Calculator and System Monitor, default dimming on admin prompts, terminology cleanup, better clipboard and bell handling, and various widget fixes. This release saw the X11 backend of KWin split off into a separate project to avoid potential regressions affecting the Wayland backend.
6.5	No	21 Oct 2025	Automatic light-to-dark theme switching, pinnable clipboard items, application permissions page, grayscale color filter, improvements to screen reader, various performance and widget enhancements.
6.6	Yes	17 Feb 2026	An on-screen keyboard, Plasma Login Manager, and text extraction from screenshots with Optical Character Recognition (OCR) enhance usability and accessibility, e.g., with a grayscale filter for color blindness and customizable global themes.
6.7	No	16 Jun 2026	Per-screen virtual desktops (on the Wayland session only), microphone volume testing, and improved Unicode support with the virtual keyboard when holding down specific keys. This was the final release of Plasma to have support for an X11 Session for the Plasma Desktop.
6.8	No	14 Oct 2026	A new accessibility feature: "dwell clicker", the ability to set certain CPUs to certain tasks, lower latency remote desktop, rounded corners and shadows for certain third-party apps, such as Steam, improved Union theming and removing support for an X11 Session.
Unsupported Latest version Future version
