= KDE e.V. =

Foundation behind the KDE community

- Formation: 27 November 1997; 28 years ago
- Founder: Matthias Ettrich and Matthias Kalle Dalheimer
- Type: NPO
- Purpose: Free software
- Headquarters: Prinzenstraße 85 F, 10969 Berlin, Germany
- Key people: Aleix Pol i Gonzàlez (President)
- Subsidiaries: KDE
- Website: ev.kde.org

KDE e.V. is a non-profit organization that represents the KDE community in legal and financial matters. Founded on 27 November 1997, it is headquartered in Berlin, Germany. The association supports KDE through monetary, hardware, and other donations, which are used to aid development efforts without influencing the direction of the project's development. The abbreviation 'e.V.' stands for eingetragener Verein, meaning 'registered association' in German.

== History ==
In August 1997, the first KDE community meeting, known as KDE One, was held in Arnsberg, Germany. The event brought together 15 participants and operated on a budget of DM 14,000. During the meeting, organizer Matthias Kalle Dalheimer realized that handling donations and expenses through his personal bank account was impractical. As a result, he proposed establishing a formal organization to manage financial and legal matters for the KDE community.

On 27 November 1997, KDE e.V. was officially registered as a non-profit association (eingetragener Verein) under German law in Tübingen. Matthias Ettrich became the organization's first president, and Dalheimer served as vice president. To meet the legal requirement of seven founding members, they recruited housemates and friends to join the association.

KDE e.V. has continued to support the KDE community by managing donations and organizing events. Over time, it has expanded its role, developed formal membership programs, and hired staff.

In October 2006, Mark Shuttleworth became the first individual patron of KDE, followed by Trolltech as the first corporate patron in February 2007. Additional patrons, including KDAB, Intel, and Novell, joined later that year. In 2008, KDE e.V. and Wikimedia Deutschland opened shared offices in Frankfurt, marking the hiring of KDE e.V.'s first employee. The organization later moved its offices to Berlin in cooperation with the Free Software Foundation Europe (FSFE).

In 2010, KDE e.V. launched the "Join the Game" campaign, an initiative that invited individuals to become supporting members without requiring a time commitment. Georg Greve, founder of the FSFE, was the first to join.

== Organization ==
Current board of directors
Occupation	Name
President	Aleix Pol González
Vice President	Lydia Pintscher
Treasurer and Vice President	Eike Hein
Board Member	Nate Graham
Board Member	Adriaan de Groot

KDE e.V. includes three types of memberships: Active members, Extraordinary members and Supporting Members. Both natural persons and legal bodies may become members. The Active members have contributed to KDE community. The supporting members are supporting the KDE through financial contributions, consist of: basysKom GmbH, Digia, Sirius Corporation Ltd, and Google. The Patron of KDE is the highest level of supporting member, are: SUSE, Klarälvdalens Datakonsult AB, and Nokia. All association’s members are invited to attend the general assembly. The general assembly is often as part of Akademy.

The board of directors are responsible for the operation of the association. The board of directors has five members via election held by general assembly. KDE e.V. office is located in Berlin. It has 1 paid administrative employee, called business manager. The business manager is full-time responsible for daily operations, resource acquisition and managing interns. KDE e.V. offers internships to qualified students. In Spain, the official representative of KDE e.V. is KDE España. KDE e.V. is an associate organization of the FSFE and a licensee of the Open Invention Network.

== Activities ==
KDE e.V. organizes and subsidizes events including developer sprints, Camp KDE and Akademy. It handles the legal issues around the KDE community.

The working groups are a structure which will formalize some roles within KDE and enhance coordination within KDE, communication between parts of KDE. Currently, active working groups are community working group (CWG), marketing working group (MWG) and system administration (sysadmin). Disbanded working groups are human computer interaction working group (HCI WG) and technical working group (TWG).

The System Administration Working Group is responsible for administration of KDE servers. The Marketing Working Group was founded in November 2005, help to coordination of marketing and promotion. Currently members are Troy Unrau, Franz Keferböck and Wade Olson. The Community Working Group was founded in August 2008, helps with community advice when needed.

The Technical Working Group is to coordinate planning and release. Furthermore, they should decide what software is included in KDE or removed, as different programs will be combined into modules and the dependencies between the modules and to external software should be allowed. A further task, it is a contact point for general technical questions related to KDE to be contacts between developers of the project and produce. After one year, the Technical Working Group has been replaced by the Release team, that is independent of KDE e.V..
