= Sirius Corporation Ltd =

UK open-source services company

Sirius Corporation ltd
- Industry: Open source software services
- Founded: 1998
- Headquarters: Weybridge, UK
- Key people: Mark Taylor, Founder and CEO, Kelly Taylor, Director
- Products: Enterprise Open Source services
- Website: www.siriusopensource.com

Sirius Corporation ltd is a company based in Weybridge, United Kingdom, which provides a range of open-source software services to medium and enterprise level organisations to allow them to maximise their productivity whilst minimising their risk. Sirius provide network and infrastructure deployment, application development and technical support.

Open Source is a model being utilised by many in place of proprietary software. Wikipedia is an example of a project based on the philosophy of open source.

Sirius provide a full Enterprise Stack which can include, but is not limited to, products such as Asterisk (VoIP), JBoss (application server), Apache (web server), Squid (proxy), OGo/Scalix (groupware), Sendmail/Cyrus (email), Samba/CUPS (file & print), OpenLDAP (directory server), PostgreSQL (database), PostGIS (geographic information systems) and Linux (operating system).

Mark Taylor founded Sirius Corporation in 1998.

Sirius have worked with household brands including PepsiCo, BOC, Three, Sony Ericsson, Axa and Specsavers.

In 2008, Sirius was among 12 software suppliers to have been awarded places on the £80m Software for Educational Institutions Framework (SEIF) agreement and in 2009 .

In 2009, Sirius working in partnership with the North West Learning Grid and were awarded a Highly Commended for their work on the NDRB (National Digital Resource Bank) at the e-Government National Awards.
