= IgHome =

Personal web portal by Google

Symbaloo
- Company type: Limited Liability Company
- Available in: Multilingual
- Founded: 2012
- Area served: Worldwide
- Founder: Mike Sutton
- Website: www.ighome.com
- Launched: 2012
- Current status: Active

igHome is a news page introduced in 2012 as an alternative to iGoogle, the personal web portal launched by Google in May 2005. Originally designed as a customizable "home page", like iGoogle, offering users the possibility to build a personalized start page containing a central search box and a number of gadgets. igHome mimicked the user interface of iGoogle. Registered igHome users could create multiple tabs and import RSS feeds.

As of 1st October 2026 igHome removed all customization (and existing registered users' customizations), instead providing a default, unmodifiable view of a variety of news widgets (RSS feeds) divided across themed tabs.

== See also ==
- Start page
- iGoogle
- Protopage
- Start.me
