= KDE Plasma 4 =

2008 desktop environment

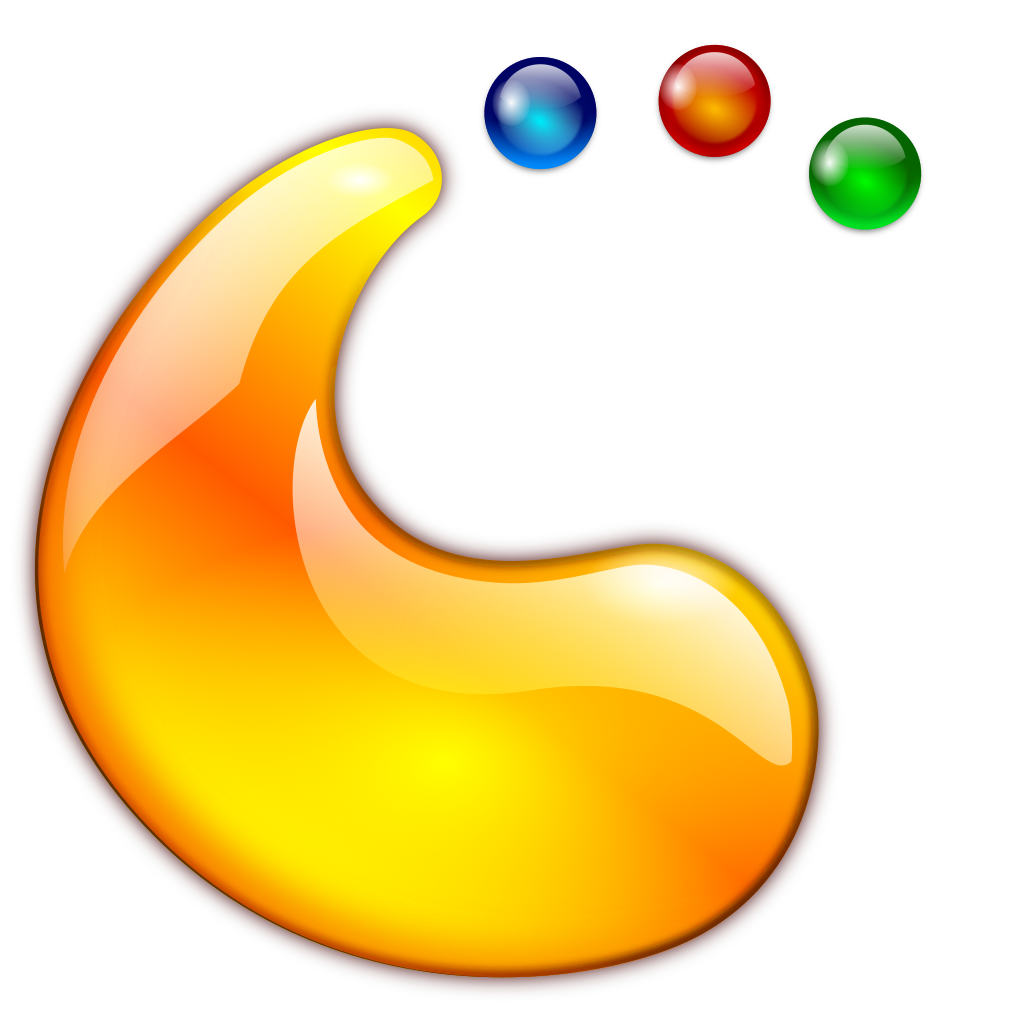

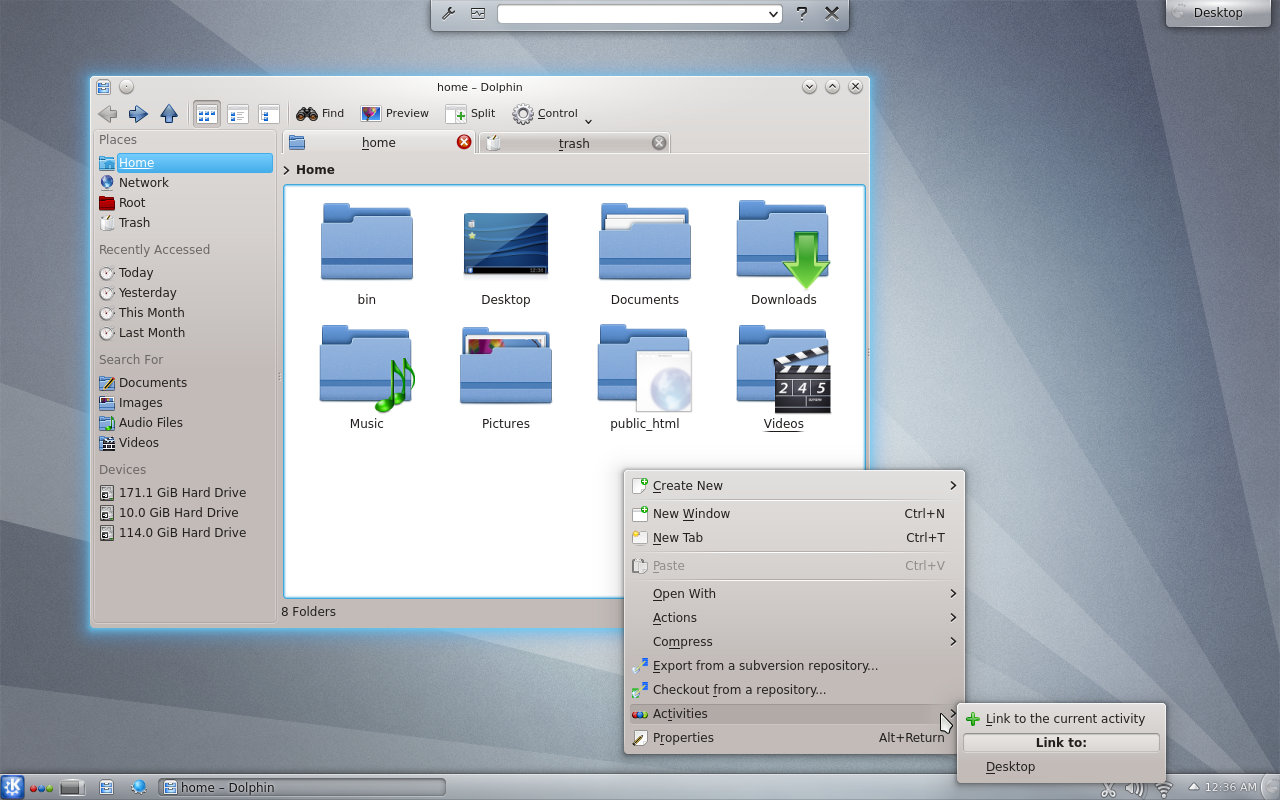
- Developer: KDE
- Release: 11 January 2008; 18 years ago
- Final release: KDE SC 4.14.3 / 11 November 2014; 11 years ago
- Written in: C++, QML
- Operating system: Unix-like
- Predecessor: K Desktop Environment 3
- Successor: KDE Plasma 5
- Type: Desktop environment
- License: LGPLv2.1+
- Website: web.archive.org/web/20150319161319/https://www.kde.org/workspaces/plasmadesktop/
- Repository: invent.kde.org/plasma/

KDE Plasma 4 is the fourth generation of the KDE workspace environments. It consists of three workspaces, each targeting a certain platform: Plasma Desktop for traditional desktop PCs and notebooks, Plasma Netbook for netbooks, and Plasma Active for tablet PCs and similar devices.

KDE Plasma 4 was released as part of KDE Software Compilation 4 and replaced Kicker, KDesktop, and SuperKaramba, which formed the Desktop in earlier KDE releases. They are bundled as the default environment with a number of free software operating systems, such as Chakra, Kubuntu, Mageia (DVD version), openSUSE, or TrueOS.

With the release of KDE SC 4.11 on 14 August 2013, KDE Plasma 4 was placed into a feature freeze and turned into a long-term stable package until August 2015. On 15 July 2014 KDE Plasma 4's successor, KDE Plasma 5, was released.

== Features ==
Plasma features containments, which are essentially applets that contain other applets. Two examples of containments are the desktop background and the taskbar. A containment can be anything the developer wants: an image (either raster graphics or an SVG image), animation, or even OpenGL. Images are most commonly used, but with Plasma the user could set any applet as the desktop background without losing functionality of the applet. This also allows for applets to be dragged between the desktop and the taskbar (two separate containments), and have a separate visualization for the more confined taskbar.

Plasma separates components into "data engine" and their visualization counterparts. This is intended to reduce the total programming effort when there are multiple possible visualizations of given data; and to make it easier for the data engine and the workspaces to be written independently.

The scalable nature of the Plasma widgets allows for them to be resized and rotated to any size, with only a brief pause to redraw themselves. The Kross scripting framework allows developers to write widgets in a variety of programming languages in addition to C++.

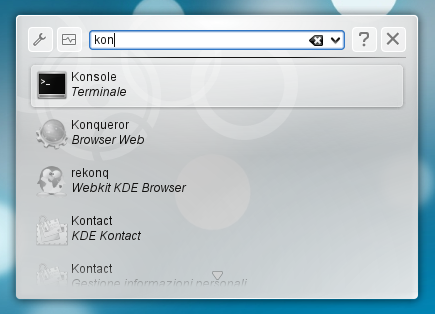
KRunner in Plasma Desktop 4.3

KRunner is a versatile tool for several functions. It replaces the dialog box "Run Command" from K Desktop Environment 3, and also inherits from the application launcher feature, expanding the possibilities through a modular plug. KRunner stores previously entered commands and searches, accessible via an auto-complete feature. KRunner can be shown on the desktop via the keyboard combination Alt+F2 or by selecting "Run Command ..." in the desktop menu.

These functions are handled by the plugin:

- Application launcher: Type at least three letters of the desired name or description. KRunner shows applications associated with the terms of the search and allows the selection of the desired one.
- Calculator: Simply enter the desired operation to show the result. It also supports sophisticated expressions.
- Contacts can search for entries in KDE's address book allowing users to directly open, for example, KMail to write an e-mail. The address of the recipient of your choice is automatically added to the message.
- Unit Converter converts values between different units of measure.
- Web history: Search history of recently visited sites in Konqueror.
- Recent documents: Search for recently opened files.

== Available Plasma Workspaces ==
=== Desktop ===
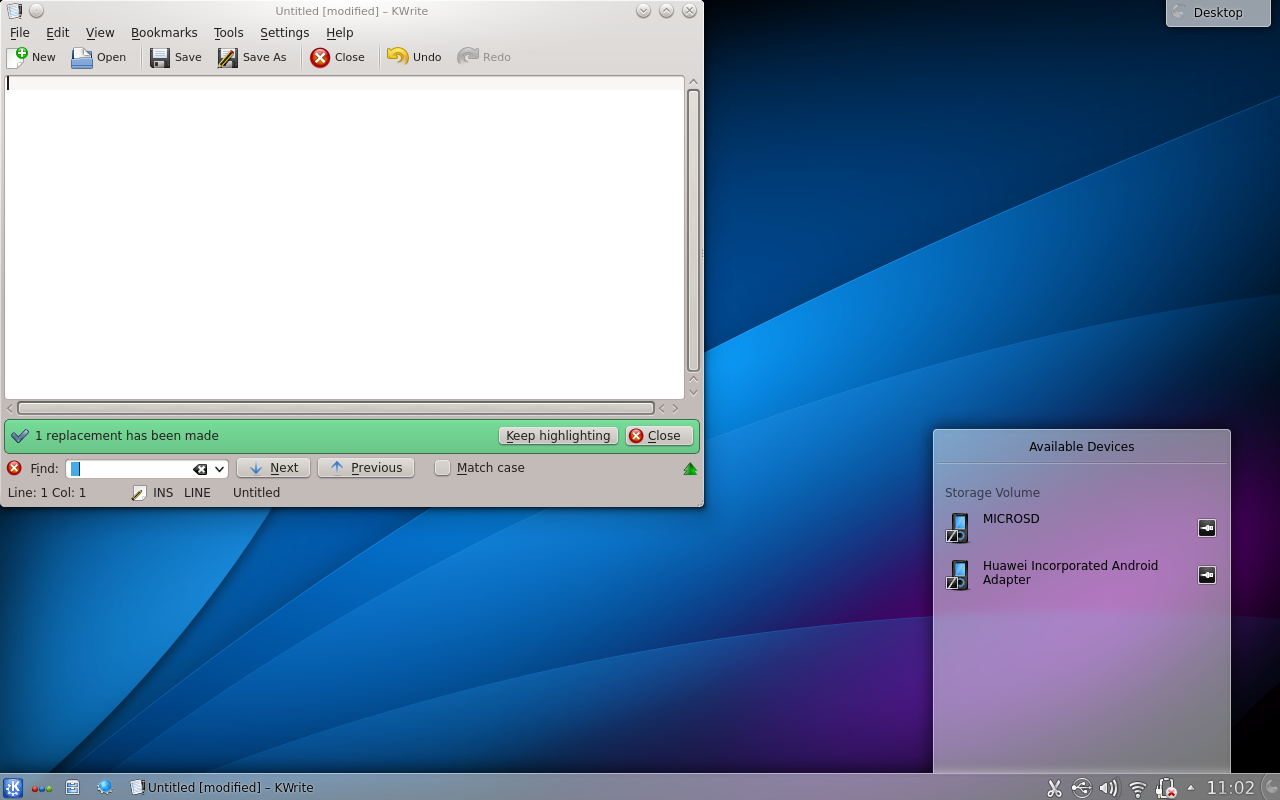
KDE Plasma Desktop 4

Plasma Desktop was a standard desktop interface. It was declared mature with the release of KDE SC 4.2. It is designed for desktop PCs and larger laptops. In its default configuration it resembles K Desktop Environment 3 and Microsoft Windows XP but extensive configurability allows radical departures from the default layout.

Its technology is a fundamental rewrite of several desktop interaction programs included in previous KDE desktop environments for Unix-like systems, focusing on eye candy and special graphical effects. The Desktop Workspace replaces the previous KDesktop shell, Kicker taskbar and SuperKaramba widget engine used in the K Desktop Environment 3 series with a unified system of widgets that can be configured and replaced with alternative designs.

From KDE 4.0 to KDE 4.2, the default theme Oxygen was characterized by dark tones. In KDE 4.3, replaced by the new Air theme, which predominates in transparency and white as base color. New themes for Plasma can be chosen and installed through software like Discover or online at store.kde.org.

==== Supported widgets ====
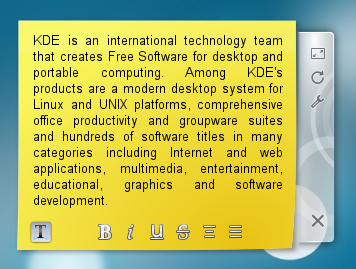
Notes widget in Plasma 4.3

This is a list of widgets that the current release version of Plasma supports. Not all widgets are supported by default in all Linux distributions; some may require different packages, or even a recompilation of Plasma.

- First generation native widgets (In C++, JavaScript, Ruby or Python. In many distributions, the Ruby and Python bindings must be downloaded separately as packages)
- Second generation native widgets written in QML.
- Apple Dashboard widgets
- SuperKaramba widgets – used in KDE 3.
- Web widgets (supports HTML and JavaScript)

Previous Plasma Workspaces releases also supported Edje gadgets and E17 modules. Support for those was developed in 2008 but later, in 2010, removed.

Google Gadgets were also supported. After Google announced to discontinue its two services that utilize Gadgets – Google Desktop and iGoogle – KDE removed support for this widget engine in early 2013.

=== Netbook ===
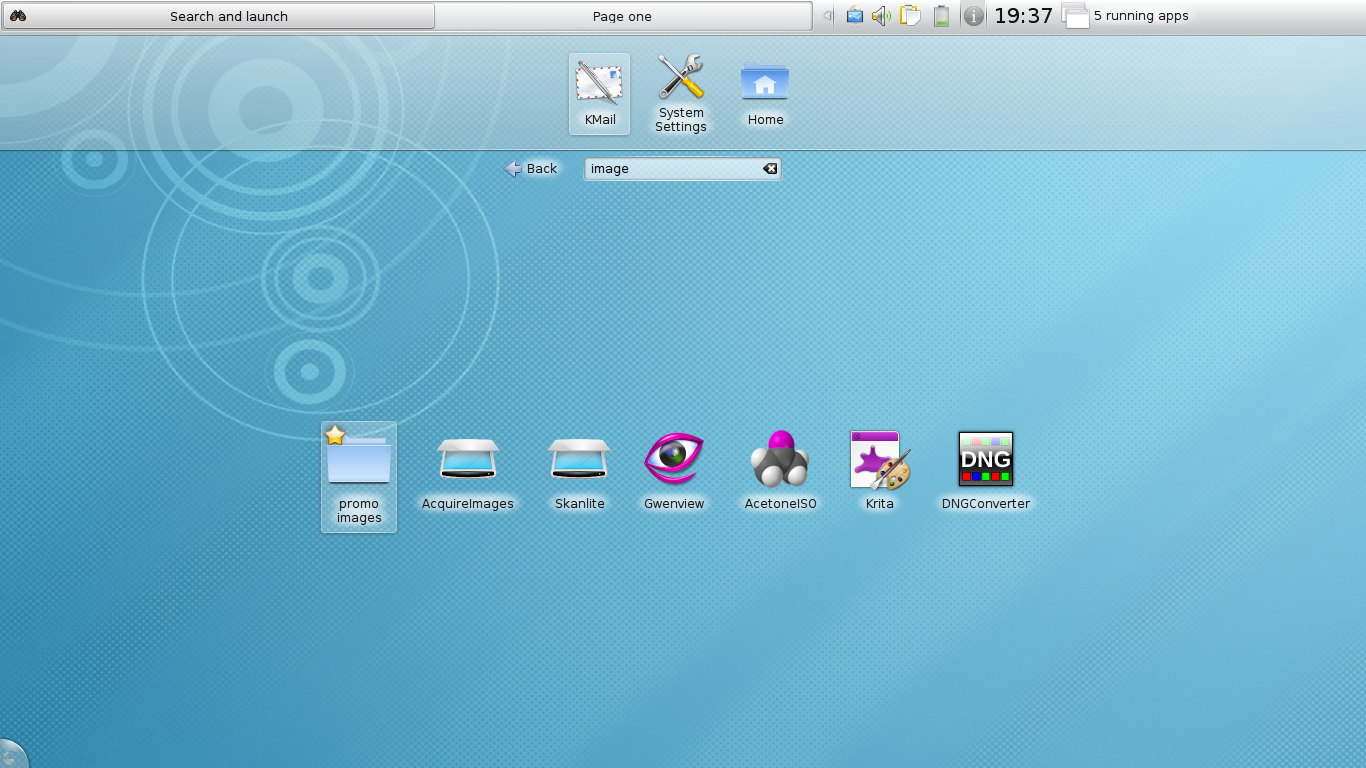
KDE Plasma Netbook's Search and Launch view

Plasma Netbook is the second workspace. It aims at netbooks and may also be used on tablet PCs. The first stable release shipped with KDE SC 4.4.

=== Plasma Active ===
Plasma Active

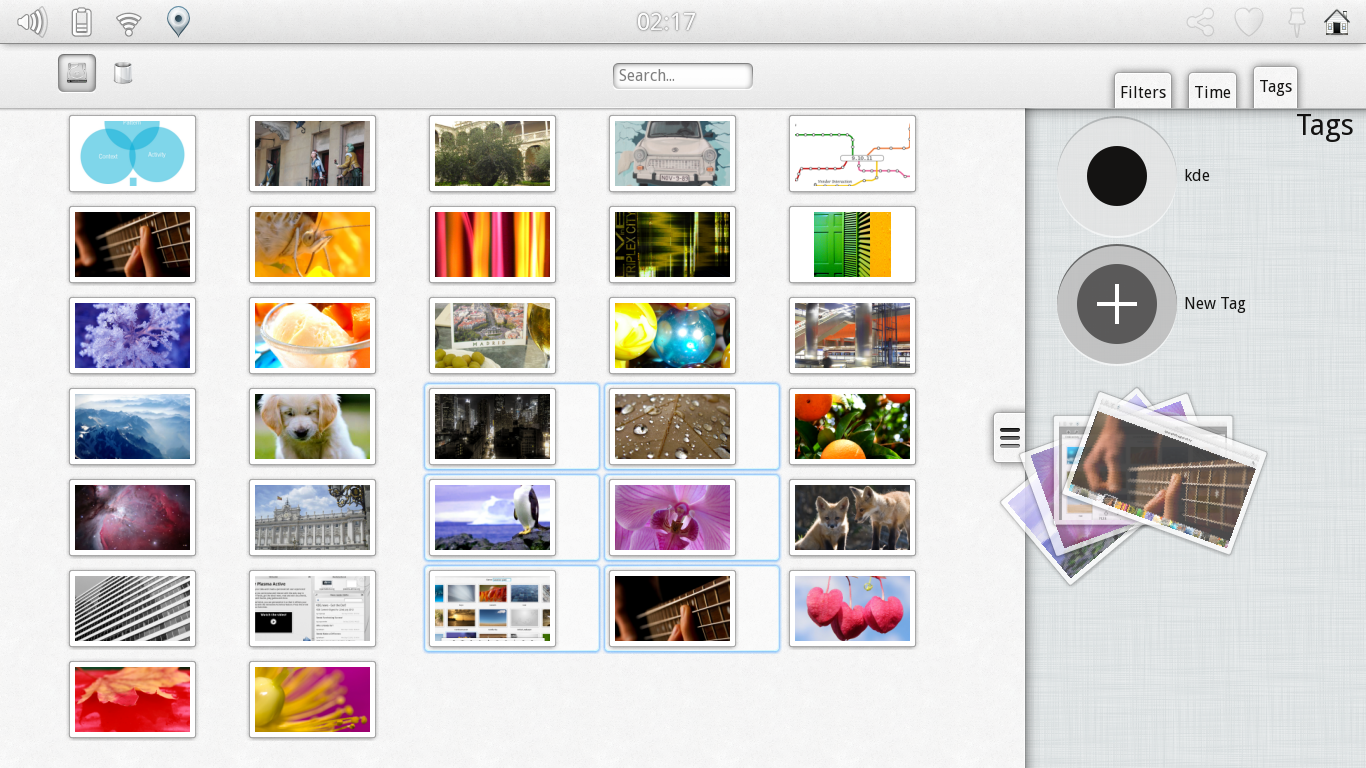
- Plasma Active’s Semantic File Browser
- Developers: KDE, basysKom, Coherent Theory, open-slx
- Release: October 9, 2011; 15 years ago
- Stable release: 4.0 / September 5, 2013; 13 years ago
- Written in: C++, QML
- Operating system: Mer, openSUSE
- License: GPLv2
- Website: plasma-active.org
- Repository: invent.kde.org/plasma/

Plasma Active was a workspace for devices with touchscreens. It shipped with several applications such as Kontact Touch and a document viewer based on Calligra Suite. It has been succeeded by KDE Plasma Mobile starting with KDE Plasma 5.

==== Contour ====
Contour was the name of an interface for tablet devices. Its development was started in April 2011 by basysKom. Replacing an earlier tablet prototype, Contour has then become the main workspace UI of Plasma Active and was shipped as 1.0 in October 2011.

==== Mobile ====
Plasma Mobile was targeted at smartphones and small tablet devices that are mainly used via touch input. It was originally expected to be released in 2011 along with Plasma Active 1.0 but development focus shifted towards Contour. A new version with the same name but based on KDE Frameworks 5 has been announced on 25 July 2015.

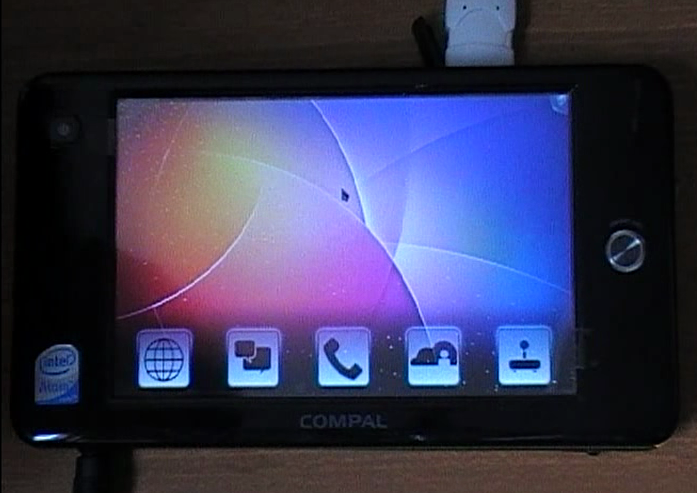
First technology preview of Plasma Mobile during the “Tokamak 4” developer sprint in February 2010

Technology preview of Plasma Mobile on video

== History ==
KDE 4.0 was released in January 2008. Linux.com described the reaction from users as a "revolt", writing that the backlash KDE 4.0 received was on a scale that was unprecedented for a FOSS project. Although it was a developer's release, several distributions made the KDE 4.0 desktop environment available to their users without specifying that it was an experimental option. openSUSE released a more polished KDE 4 option while other distributions "released packages that simply [didn't] work," according to project leader Aaron Seigo. As a result, many users complained about the loss of features and stability. A number of KDE developers, including project leader Aaron Seigo, were targeted for abuse by outlets like Linux Hater's Blog. Several KDE developers stepped back from the public scrutiny.
