= PearOS =

Arch-based Linux distribution

pearOS
- Developer: Alexandru Bălan
- OS family: Unix-like
- Working state: Current
- Latest release: 26.6 / 16 June 2026; 5 months ago
- Repository: https://github.com/pearOS-archlinux
- Marketing target: Desktop
- Package manager: pacman
- Supported platforms: x86-64
- Kernel type: Monolithic (Linux)
- Influenced by: macOS
- Default user interface: KDE Plasma
- Official website: pearos.xyz

pearOS, also known as pearOS NiceC0re, is a Linux distribution based on Arch Linux, with an emphasis on a macOS-inspired user interface.

Its development aims to combine the Arch Linux base with a highly customized desktop environment inspired by macOS, while retaining access to Arch Linux's software ecosystem and customization capabilities.

== History ==
The original Pear OS project was developed by French developer David Tavares in the early 2010s. It was initially based on Ubuntu and used the GNOME desktop environment, with extensive customization intended to resemble Apple's Mac OS X. The project went through several releases between 2011 and 2013. In 2014, Tavares announced that he had sold the distribution to an undisclosed company, which intended to use it for its own products, and development subsequently ceased.

The project was later re-released in 2016 by Portuguese developer Rodrigo Marques, continuing to be based on Ubuntu. The current pearOS project was subsequently developed by Romanian developers Alexandru Bălan and Ioana Lazăr beginning in 2019. The new project, known as pearOS NiceC0re, was rebuilt on Arch Linux rather than the original Ubuntu base and adopted a highly customized KDE Plasma desktop environment. It also introduced a new installer and further redesigned the desktop interface to reproduce the visual appearance and interaction patterns of recent versions of macOS.

== Features ==
pearOS includes a Calamares-based graphical installer, which provides a guided installation process. The installer supports automatic partitioning, manual partition control, offline installation, and multi-boot configuration. After installation, the Welcome application provides post-installation configuration features, including system updates, driver detection and installation, and installation of essential software.

Due to being based on Arch Linux, pearOS follows a rolling release update model. The Arch User Repository (AUR) is also available, along with packages from the official Arch Linux repositories. It also includes a graphical package known as the App Store.

One of pearOS's defining features is its macOS-inspired user interface. Although the default desktop environment is KDE Plasma, it is extensively customized to reproduce the appearance and user experience of macOS. The interface incorporates familiar visual elements and layout conventions intended to make the system more recognizable to users accustomed to macOS. A major component of this visual design is Liquid Gel, a customized interface developed for pearOS. It provides fluid and translucent visual effects throughout the desktop, including windows, panels, and other interface elements.
