= JingPad A1 =

- Also known as: JingPad C1 (Android Variant)
- Developer: Jingling
- Type: Tablet computer
- Released: 2021
- Introductory price: $700 USD
- Operating system: JingOS
- System on a chip: Unisoc Tiger T7510
- CPU: 4x Arm Cortex-A75 2.0GHz, 4x Arm Cortex-A55 1.8GHz
- Memory: 8GB LPDDR4 RAM
- Storage: 128 GB, 256 GB UMCP, microSD
- Display: 11 inches (279 mm) 2368 x 1728 px (266 ppi) with a 4:3 aspect ratio
- Graphics: PowerVR GM9446
- Input: Multi-touch touch screen, headset controls, Fingerprint sensor, Six-axis gyro, Ambient light sensor, JingPad Pencil, JingPad Keyboard
- Camera: Front: 8MP; Rear: 16MP
- Connectivity: Wi-Fi Wi-Fi 2.4G/5G dual-band WiFi Bluetooth 5.0 Wi-Fi + Cellular: GPS, Glonass, Galileo, Beidou
- Power: 9V/2A 18W lithium-polymer 8000 mAh battery
- Dimensions: 243 mm (9.6 in) (h); 178 mm (7.0 in) (w); 6.7 mm (0.26 in) (d)
- Weight: 500g
- Website: https://en.jingos.com/jingpad-a1/

The JingPad A1 is a Linux based tablet developed by Jingling. The JingPad A1 was released in 2021. The tablet is using its own JingOS Linux distribution which is based on the Android hardware layer Halium and KDE Plasma mobile. Ubuntu Touch has been ported to the tablet. The device is using a Unisoc Tiger T510 SOC, has 8GB of RAM and a maximum of 256GB storage. It has a pencil and attachable keyboard accessories.

Reviews said that the device is physically well made but its drivers are unfinished and as being built on top of the Android compatibility layer and not truly open hardware it is unknown what its target group is.
