= Xsm =

XSM is a three-letter acronym that may refer to:

- xsm is the default session manager for the X Window System
- XSM (Extra Silent Motor) is Panasonic's trade name for photo lens focusing technology using an ultrasonic motor
- XSM, or Ex-Simple Minds, the Scottish rock band
- XSM, or XSupermodels, a short-lived group of House of Pain member Danny Boy
