= Plasma Bigscreen =

Plasma workspace variant for smart TVs

- Logo

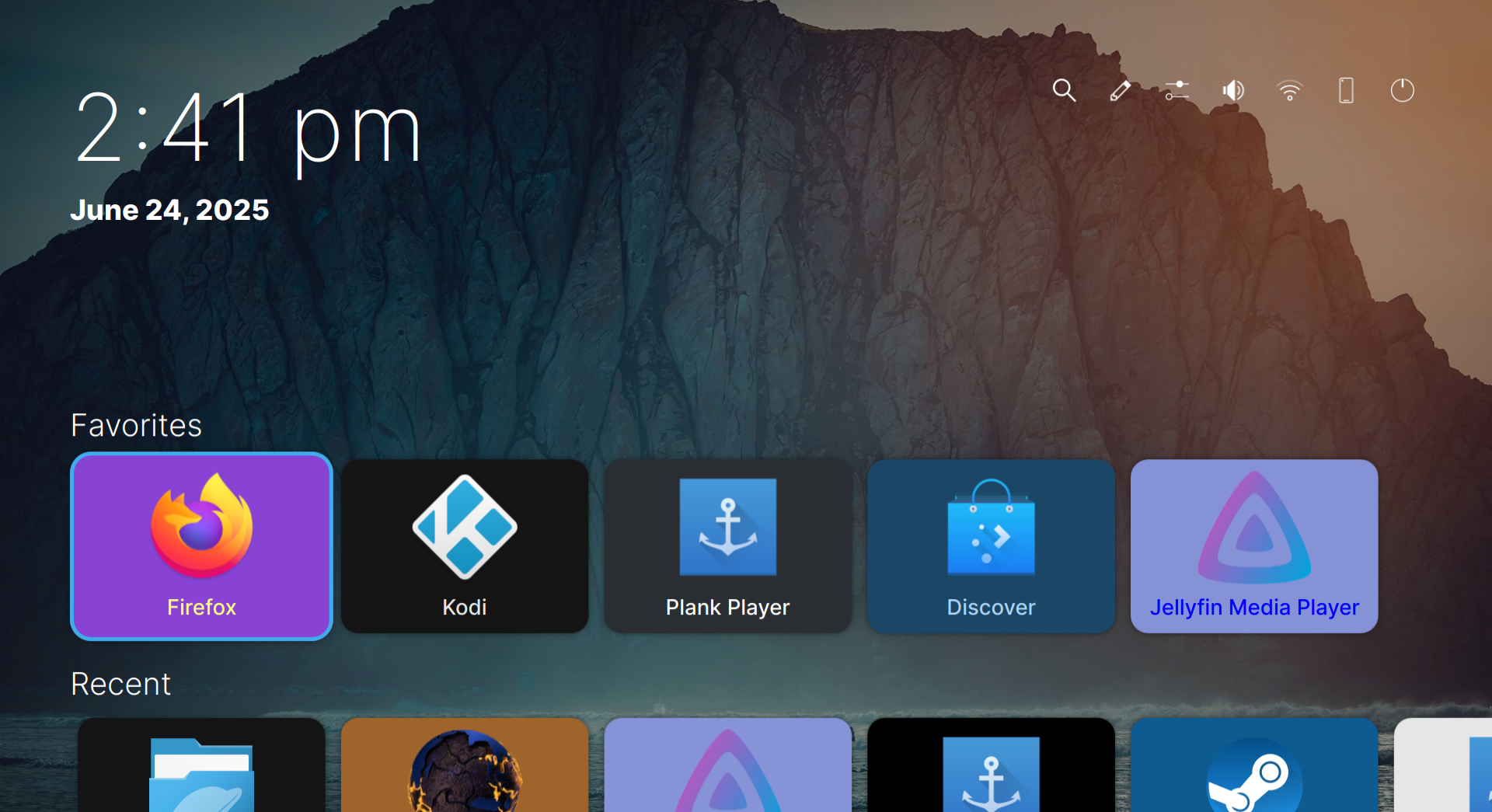
- The home screen for Plasma BigScreen as seen in 2025, showing the layout of the environment
- Developer: KDE
- Written in: C++
- Operating system: Linux
- License: GNU General Public License version 3
- Website: plasma-bigscreen.org
- Repository: invent.kde.org/plasma/plasma-bigscreen

Plasma Bigscreen is a software project from KDE which contains an interface optimized for Smart TVs, set-top boxes, and other computers such as the Raspberry Pi or Xiaomi TV Box, which can be connected to large displays.

== Software ==
The desktop environment was initially based on KDE Plasma 5, but is planned for future distribution with KDE Plasma 6.. It has also been ported to KDE Frameworks 6 and Qt6 to give support for Plasma 6 libraries, with some compatibility still for Plasma 5 as of March 2026. Voice control was provided through integration with Mycroft AI, but was obsoleted by late 2024. Plasma Bigscreen supports HDMI-CEC.

== Availability ==
Plasma Bigscreen is available in the repositories of distributions shipping KDE Plasma 6.7 or later. It is also available as a KDE Neon-based image, and installable on Nura. In early 2025, it was marked as not available due to inactivity; however, active development resumed later that year. As of March 2026, developers were targeting a release date to coincide with Plasma 6.7, so that Plasma Bigscreen could be made more widely available through other KDE-based distribution repositories.

== See also ==
- Plasma Mobile
- Mycroft (software)
