= Kicker (KDE) =

Taskbar for the K Desktop Environment

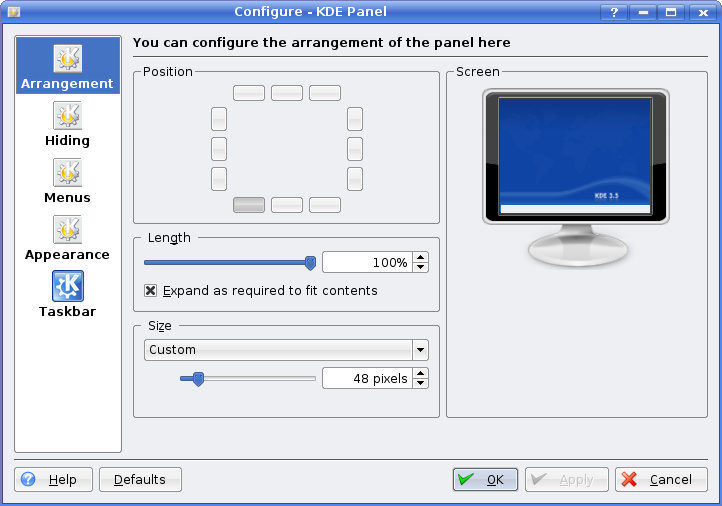
- Various aspects of the KDE 3 panel could be configured, such as its arrangement on the user's desktop
- Type: Application launcher; Linux on the desktop
- License: GNU GPL
- Repository: mirror.git.trinitydesktop.org/cgit/tdebase/tree/kicker

Kicker (also referred to as KDE Panel) is the main panel used in KDE 3 and earlier, and also in the TDE desktop. Together with KDesktop, it forms the graphical shell. It can be customized by the user. By default, it has the K Menu, a Desktop Access button, a Home button, a Konqueror button, a Kontact button, and a Help button. It also has the Desktop Preview & Pager, the Taskbar, the System Tray, and the Clock.

It was a core part of the KDE desktop, and as such, packaged as part of the kdebase module.

In KDE Software Compilation 4, Kicker, KDesktop, and SuperKaramba were replaced by KDE Plasma 4. The graphical shells KDE Plasma 4 and KDE Plasma 5 being widget engines of their own, SuperKaramba is no longer necessary and e.g. "Kicker" was re-implemented as such a desktop widget. Kicker is currently developed by the TDE developers for the Trinity Desktop Environment.

Kicker can be launched separately in other windowing environments that lack a panel of their own, such as twm, and in case the twm menu lacks some of the commands that Kicker may have. This can be done by editing a .twmrc file, or from a terminal emulator:

$ kicker &

A mostly standard Kicker on KDE 3.5.8

A customized Kicker on KDE 3.5.4

A highly modified Kicker that resembles Plasma

== Applets ==
Kicker can embed various applets into itself. The included applets as of KDE 3.5 are:

- Binary Clock
- Bookmarks Menu
- Character Selector
- Clock
- Color Picker
- Desktop Preview & Pager
- Dictionary
- Eyes
- Fifteen Pieces
- Find
- K Menu
- Keyboard Status Applet
- Klipper
- Konqueror Profiles
- Lock/Logout Buttons
- Math Expression Evaluator
- Media Control
- Moon Phase
- Network Folders
- News Ticker
- Non-KDE Application Launcher
- Print System
- Public File Server
- Quick File Browser
- Quick Launcher
- Recent Documents
- Run Command
- Runaway Process Catcher
- Settings
- Show Desktop
- Sound Mixer
- Storage Media
- System Guard
- System Menu
- System Monitor
- Taskbar
- Terminal Sessions
- Trash
- Weather Report
- Window List Menu
- Wireless Network Information
- World Wide Watch
- aRts Control

== See also ==
- Linux on the desktop
- Taskbar
- Docky
- GNOME Panel
