= Plasma Mobile =

Plasma workspace variant for smartphones

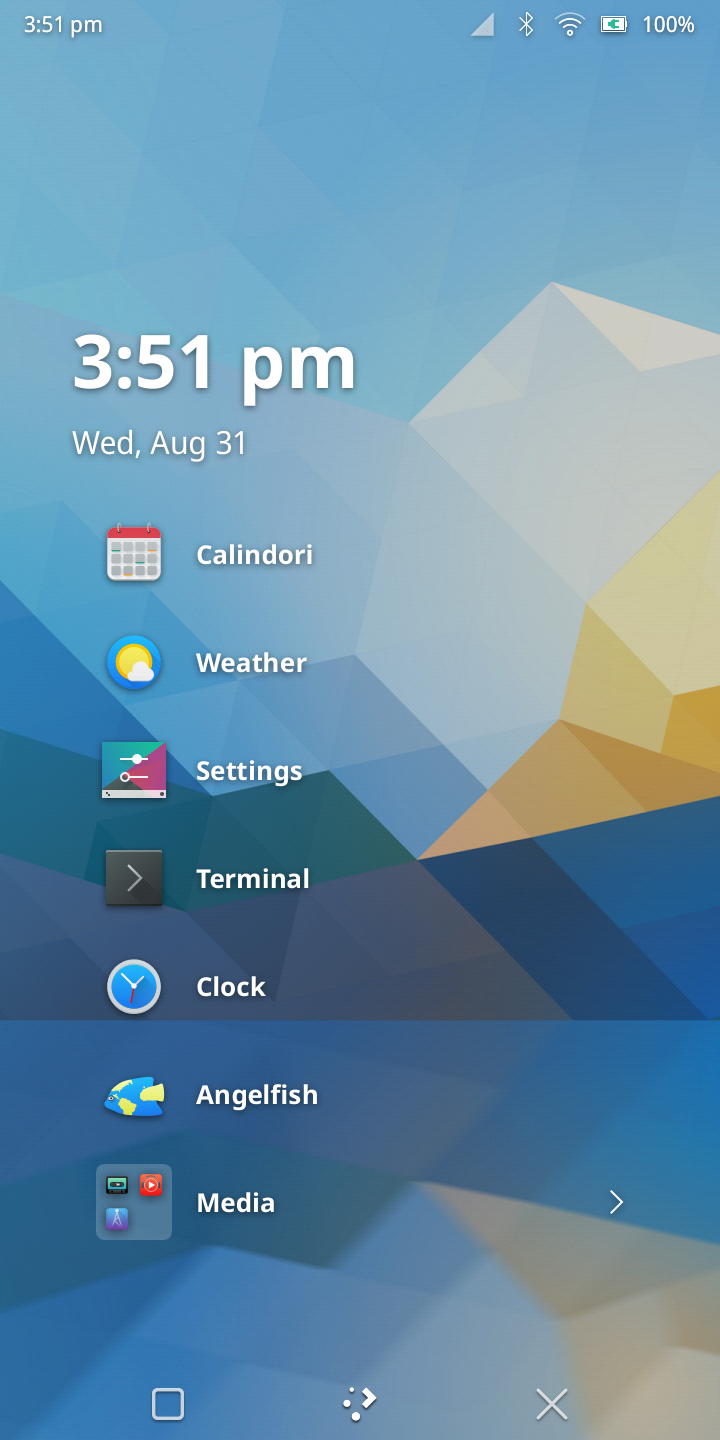
- Developer: KDE
- Stable release: 6.7.5 / 8 September 2026; 29 days ago
- Preview release: n/a
- Written in: C++, QML
- Operating system: Linux
- License: GPLv2
- Website: www.plasma-mobile.org
- Repository: invent.kde.org/plasma/plasma-mobile

Plasma Mobile is a Plasma variant for smartphones. It is currently available for the PinePhone, and supported devices for Nura, such as the OnePlus 6.

It is shipped by several Linux distributions, such as Nura and Manjaro.

== History ==
After Plasma Active sponsor Coherent Theory (under the Make·Play·Live brand) had given up their ambitions to release a tablet computer, Blue Systems emerged as a new sponsor in 2015 and shifted the focus of Plasma's handheld work towards smartphones. The official announcement of the new form-factor interface was on 25 July 2015 at Akademy, accompanied by a working prototype running on a Nexus 5. Pine64 began sales of their PinePhone mobile device, with the KDE Community Edition being made available as pre-orders on 1 December 2020.

Plasma Mobile switched from oFono to ModemManager.

== Technology ==
Plasma Mobile uses KWin's Wayland session and the Qt framework. Distributions shipping Plasma Mobile can choose to support Android applications through Waydroid, which runs Android in a container on the device.

== Gallery ==
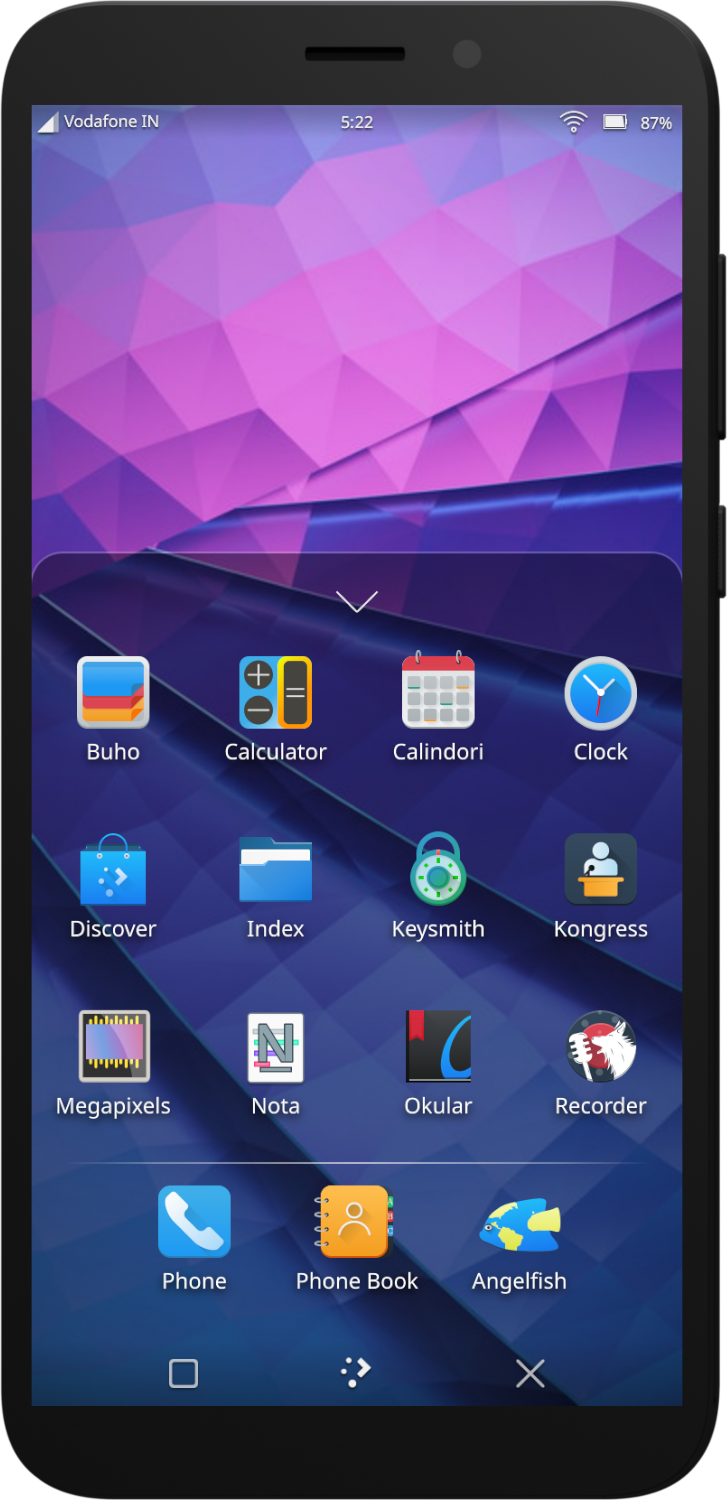
Plasma Mobile running on PinePhone

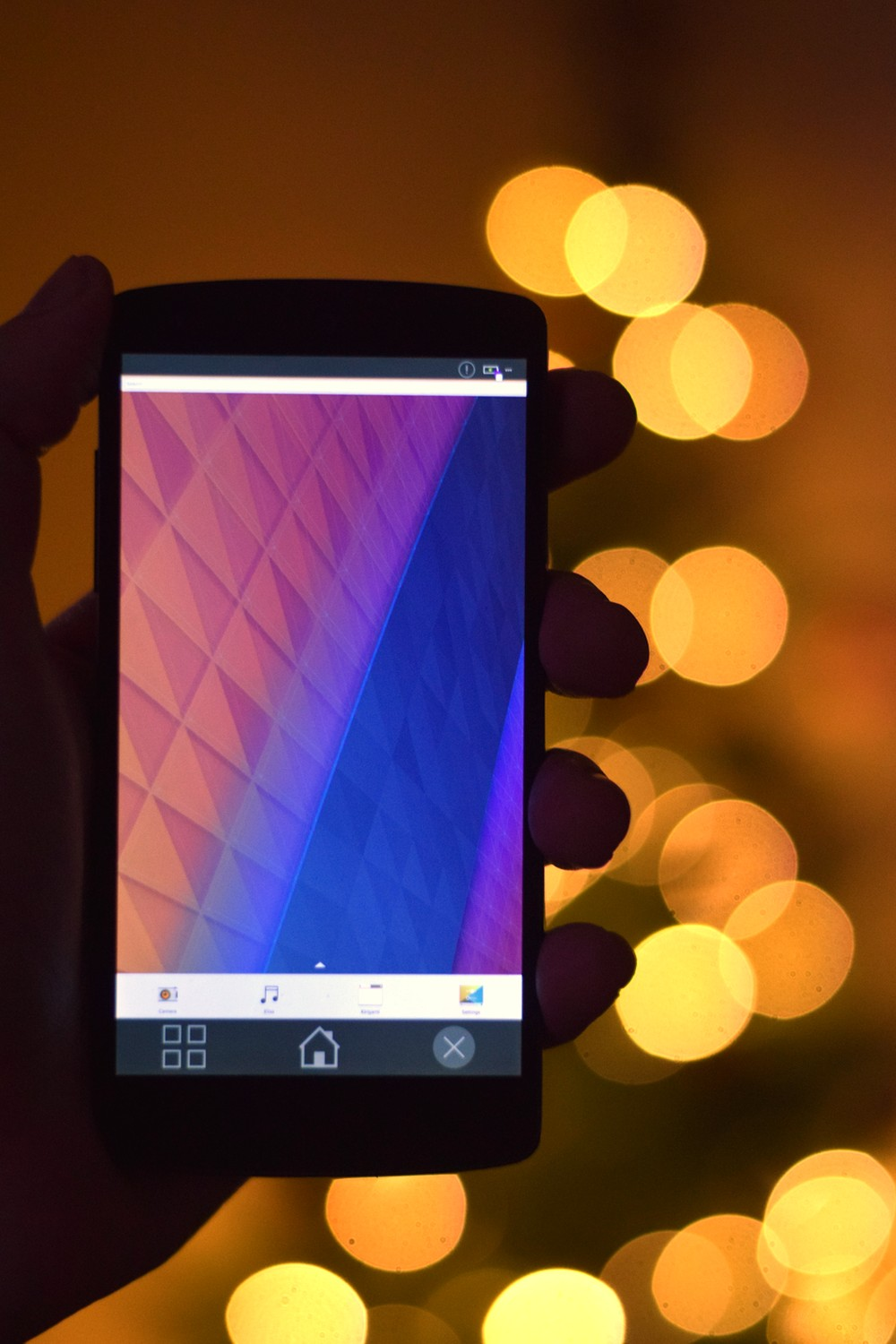
Plasma Mobile on the Nexus 5

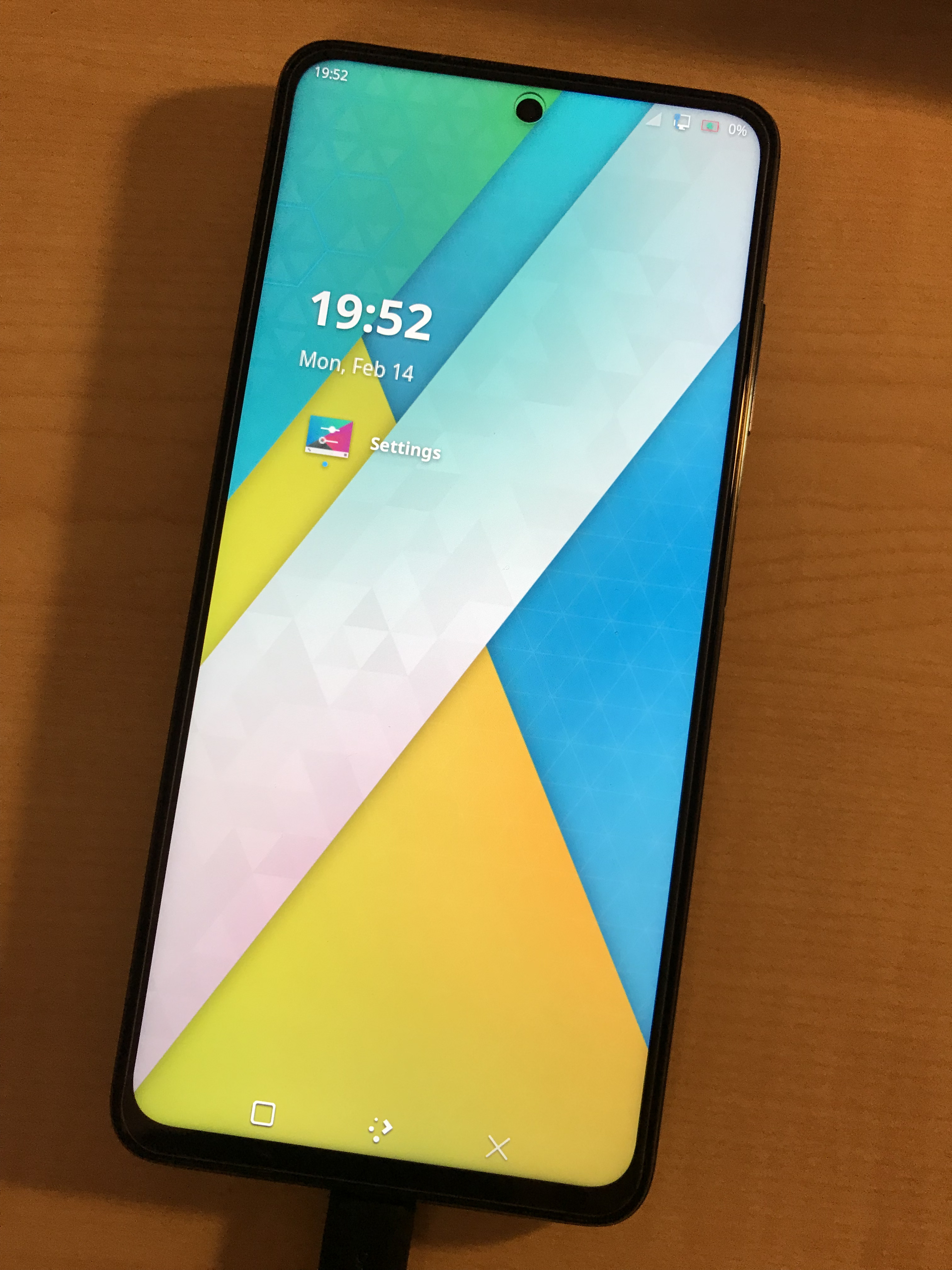
Plasma Mobile on the Xiaomi POCO X3 NFC

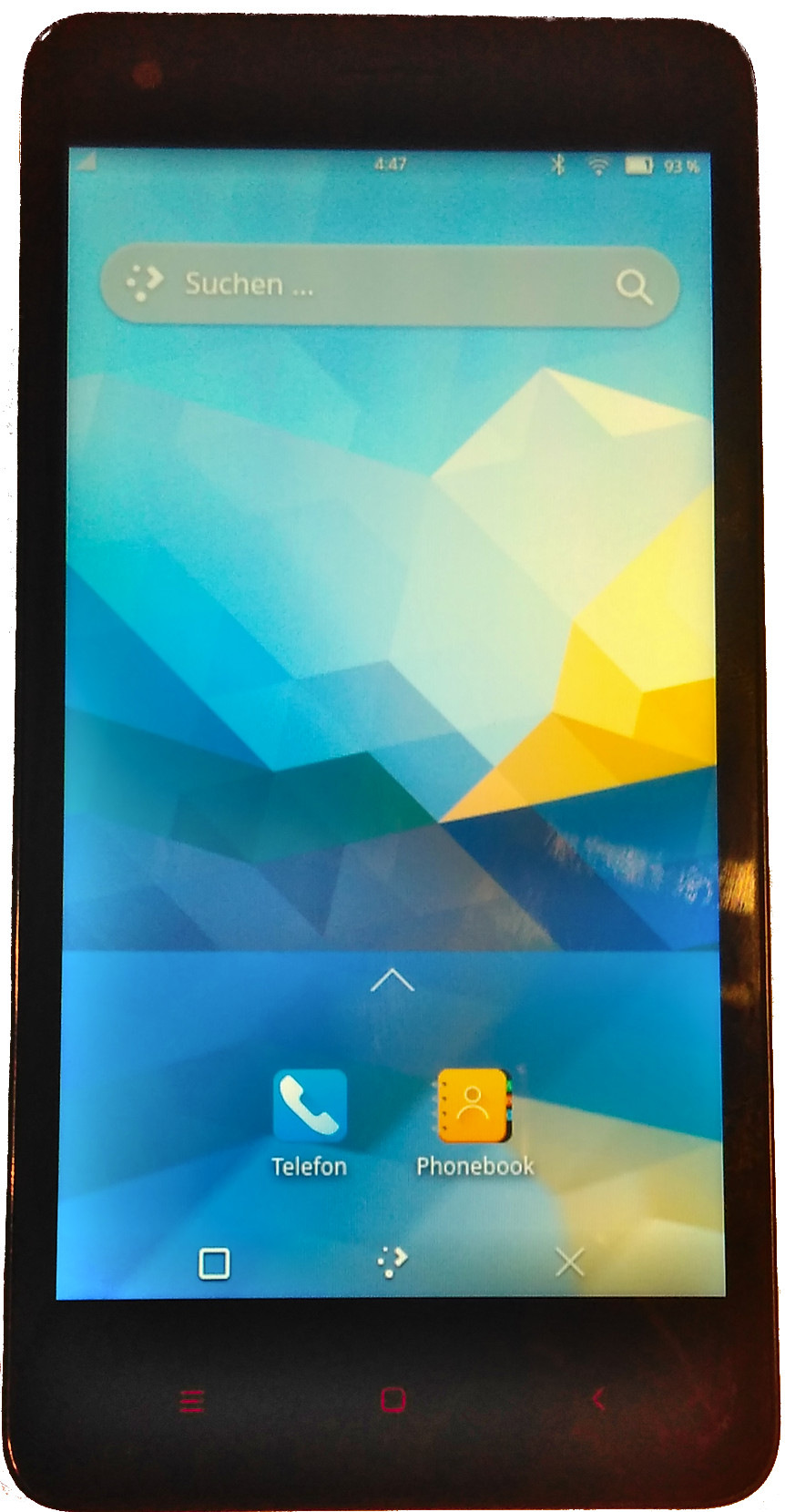
Plasma Mobile running on the Xiaomi Redmi 2 Prime

== See also ==
- KDE
- KDE Plasma
- Phosh
- Plasma Bigscreen
