= Google Gadgets =

Dynamic web content

Google Gadgets are dynamic web content that can be embedded on a web page. They can be added to and interact strongly with Google's iGoogle personalized home page (discontinued in November 2013, although iGoogle Gadgets still work on other websites) and the Google Desktop (discontinued in September 2011) application, as well as Google Wave (also no longer supported by Google) and Google Sites. Webmasters can add and customize a gadget to their own business or personal web site, a process called "syndication".

Gadgets are developed by Google and third-party developers using the Google Gadgets API, using basic web technologies such as XML and JavaScript.

== Multi-user persistent - Wave Gadgets ==
With the advent of Google Wave (now Apache Wave), gadgets became able to have persistent storage and multi-user capabilities and better state management. Gadgets using Google Wave in this way were simply known as 'Wave Gadgets'. For instance, a game written using a Google Gadget could use Google Wave technology to record a list of users and high scores without having to worry about how to permanently store the scores on a hosted server. The use of Google Wave would give the gadget multi-user and permanent storage capabilities. For example, scores could be stored in a Google Wave hosted permanently by Google at no cost to the user.

As of early 2013, Google Gadgets were deprecated in Google Spreadsheets. Shortly after, they were removed from all spreadsheets.

== Technology ==
Google Gadgets are written in XML and can have HTML and JavaScript components, and were able to use Google Wave.

Here is an example of a Hello World program written using Google Gadget technology.

<?xml version="1.0" encoding="UTF-8" ?> 
<Module>  
<ModulePrefs title="Hello world example" />   
<Content type="html"><![CDATA[ 
<marquee>Hello world!</marquee>     
]]></Content> 
</Module>

Google Gadgets API is a Google API which allows developers to create Google Gadgets easily.

== See also ==
- OpenSocial
