= IGoogle =

Personal web portals developed by Google

iGoogle
- Website type: Web Gadgets
- Dissolved: November 1, 2013; 13 years ago
- Owner: Google
- Website: http://www.google.com/ig
- Commercial: Yes
- Launched: May 19, 2005; 21 years ago
- Current status: Discontinued

iGoogle (formerly Google Personalized Homepage) was a customizable Ajax-based start page or personal web portal launched by Google in May 2005. It was discontinued on November 1, 2013, because the company believed the need for it had eroded over time.

As of October 17, 2007, Google had made the service available in many localized versions in 42 languages, and in over 70 country domain-names. In February 2007, 7.1 million people used iGoogle. In April 2008, 20% of all visits to Google's homepage used iGoogle.

== Features ==
=== Gadgets ===
iGoogle gadgets interacted with the user and used the Google Gadgets API. Some gadgets for Google Desktop could also be used within iGoogle. The Google Gadgets API was public and allowed anyone to develop a gadget for any need.

Gadgets were rendered as an iframe. Security constraints prevented users from damaging the portal and other gadgets. Users communicated with other gadgets via a remote call to a common third party server.

Google also allowed users to create special gadgets that did not require the use of the Gadgets API. The gadgets were designed to be shared with friends and family. The special gadgets were required to be created using an online wizard and belong to one of the following types:

- "Framed Photo" – displayed a series of photos.
- "GoogleGram" – created special daily messages.
- "Sidebar" - designed for middle school chat rooms
- "Daily Me" – displayed user's current mood and feelings.
- "Free Form" – allowed the user to input text and an image of their choice.
- "YouTube Channel" – displayed videos from a YouTube channel.
- "Personal List" – allowed the user to create a list of items.
- "Countdown" – countdown timer.
- "Daily Literary Quote" – displayed literature-related quotes served up by ModeRoom Press.

Some of the developer-made gadgets included:

- "Meteo-si": displayed the current weather and the weather forecast for selected areas.
- "eBay Gadget": searched for items on eBay.

Additionally, a "You might also like" gadget suggested similar gadgets to those the user already had.

=== Themes ===
iGoogle with the Winter Scape theme

With iGoogle, users could select unique themes for their Google homepages; some themes were designed by Google itself and others by third parties.

== Experimental iGoogle ==
On July 8, 2008, Google announced the beginning of a testing period for a new version of iGoogle which altered some features, including replacing the tabs with left navigation, adding chat functionality, and a canvas-view gadget for RSS. Users were selected for this test and notified when they logged in by a link to a brief description and further links to forums. On the forums, it was explained by Google staff that there was no opt-out, as a control for the test. Further, there was no information on how long the test would continue. On the main discussion thread, almost 600 users expressed dissatisfaction with the new version and with the inability to opt out.

On October 16, 2008, Google announced the release of a new version of iGoogle and retired its older format. The release did not initially include the persistent chat widget. It did include the left navigation in place of tabs as well as a change to widget controls, however. The stated purpose was to prepare for OpenSocial, with the new canvas view stated as playing an important role in that. InformationWeek reported "a vocal group of users" as unhappy with the changes, pointing out that many users do not want change forced on them, and that this is a general problem with cloud software under a service provider's control.

A workaround to restore the original tab layout was found by attaching "?gl=all" to the end of the iGoogle URL. On June 4, 2009, this workaround was eliminated. Within days, another workaround was discovered. Changing the URL ending to "?hl=all" would again restore the original tab layout, with some missing links across the top of the home page, including "Maps" and "more". This workaround was again eliminated on November 18, 2009. This led to an immediate resurrection of the controversy over user choice, both in the UK and worldwide, as many people unhappy with the new layout imposed on US users had switched to the UK Google site where the workarounds still worked. Within hours, the most frequently asked question on the help forum was how to restore the old layout, and there was a large number of feature suggestions to the same effect on the Google product ideas page. Other solutions had come to the fore, which require adds-ons, greasemonkey scripts or bookmarklets.

== Discontinuation ==
On October 14, 2011, Google announced through its official blog that with its new focus on Google+, the ability to interact socially on iGoogle would be disabled on January 15, 2012, and the mobile version of iGoogle would be shut down on July 31, 2012.

On July 3, 2012, Google announced on its blog that several of its services, including iGoogle, would be retired due to "the unforeseen evolution of web and mobile apps and the erosion of the need for the site." iGoogle was retired on November 1, 2013, with the mobile version being retired on July 31, 2012.

Since Google announced its discontinuation of iGoogle, several alternatives appeared, many of which are still online (as of June 2017).

A later feature in 2022 tested a revised Google.com home page with customizable widgets at the bottom of the screen, this was compared to iGoogle. As of November 2024, this feature had not launched.
