= NEPOMUK (software) =

Open-source software

- Initial release: 1 January 2006; 20 years ago
- Written in: C++, Java
- Type: Semantic desktop
- License: Various (BSD-style preferred)
- Website: nepomuk.semanticdesktop.org

NEPOMUK (Networked Environment for Personal, Ontology-based Management of Unified Knowledge) is an open-source software specification that is concerned with the development of a social semantic desktop that enriches and interconnects data from different desktop applications using semantic metadata stored as Resource Description Framework (RDF). Between 2006 and 2008 it was funded by a European Union research project of the same name that grouped together industrial and academic actors to develop various Semantic Desktop technologies.

== Implementations ==
Three active implementations of NEPOMUK exist: A C++/KDE-based variant, a Java-based variant, and a commercial version. More versions were created during the EU project between 2006 and 2008, some active beyond the project.

=== KDE ===
NEPOMUK-KDE was originally featured as one of the newer technologies in KDE Software Compilation 4. It used Soprano as the main RDF data storage and parsing library, while handling ontology imports through the Redland RDF Application Framework Raptor parser plug-in and the storage plug-in; all RDF data was stored by Virtuoso Universal Server which also handled full-text indexing. On a technical level, NEPOMUK-KDE allowed associating metadata to various items present on a normal user's desktop such as files, bookmarks, e-mails, and calendar entries. Metadata could be arbitrary RDF. Tagging is the most user-visible metadata application.

As the KDE SC 4 series of releases progressed, it became apparent that NEPOMUK was not delivering the performance and user experience that had initially been anticipated. As a result of this, in KDE SC 4.13 a new indexing and semantic search technology Baloo was introduced, with a short transition period allowing applications to be ported and data to be migrated before the removal of NEPOMUK. Baloo initially used SQLite but currently uses LMDB for storage, and Xapian for searching.

=== Zeitgeist ===
The Zeitgeist framework, used by GNOME and Ubuntu's Unity user interface, uses the NEPOMUK ontology, as does the Tracker search engine.

=== Java ===
The Java-based implementation of NEPOMUK was finished at the end of 2008 and served as a proof-of-concept environment for several novel semantic desktop techniques. It features its own frontend (PSEW) that integrates search, browsing, recommendation, and peer-to-peer functionality. The Java implementation uses the Sesame RDF store and the Aperture framework for integrating with other desktop applications such as mail clients and browsers.

A number of artifacts have been created in the context of the Java research implementation:

- WikiModel

=== Refinder by Gnowsis ===
Implementation of the commercial Software as a service product Refinder started in 2009 and a limited beta-version was released in December 2010. Refinder was developed by Gnowsis, a spin-off company of the German Research Centre for Artificial Intelligence (DFKI) (project lead in the NEPOMUK EU project). The start-up was shut down in late 2013, with no plans to make the implementation code available.

Refinder uses the same data formats as the other implementations, but using Software as a service instead of the desktop approach of the other implementations.

== Data formats ==
- PIMO – the data format used for describing a Personal Information Model, describing Persons, Projects, Topics, Events, etc., also used in NEPOMUK-KDE.
- NIE – the NEPOMUK Information Element Ontology (and the associated ontologies NFO etc.), describing resources on a desktop (files, mails, etc.)

== See also ==
- Tracker (search software)
