= Haystack (MIT project) =

Software research project

Haystack is a project at the Massachusetts Institute of Technology to research and develop several applications around personal information management and the Semantic Web. The most notable of those applications is the Haystack client, a research personal information manager (PIM) and one of the first to be based on semantic desktop technologies. The Haystack client is published as open source software under the BSD license.

Similar to the Chandler PIM, the Haystack system unifies handling different types of unstructured information. This information has a common representation in RDF that is presented to users in a configurable human-readable way.

== Adenine ==
Haystack was developed in the RDF-aware dynamic language Adenine which was created for the project. The language was named after the nuclease adenine and is a scripting language that is cross-platform. It is the perhaps the earliest example of a homoiconic general graph (rather than list/tree) programming language. A substantial characteristic of Adenine is that this language possesses native support for the Resource Description Framework (RDF). The language constructs of Adenine are derived from Python and Lisp. Adenine is written in RDF and thus also can be represented and written with RDF based syntaxes such as Notation3 (N3).

== See also ==
- SIMILE
- Chandler (software)
- Semantic desktop
- Strigi
- Personal knowledge base
- Comparison of note-taking software
