= GNOME Activity Journal =

- Developer: GNOME Activity Journal developers
- Release: 20 January 2010; 16 years ago
- Stable release: 1.0.0 / 1 February 2021; 5 years ago
- Preview release: none
- Written in: Python
- Platform: GNOME
- License: GNU General Public License v3 and Creative Commons - Attribution Share Alike
- Website: wiki.gnome.org/Apps/ActivityJournal
- Repository: gitlab.gnome.org/crvi/gnome-activity-journal

GNOME Activity Journal is a semantic desktop browser-like application for the GNOME desktop environment. Instead of providing direct access to the hierarchical file system like most file managers, GNOME Activity Journal uses the Zeitgeist framework to classify files according to metadata. This includes time and date of previous accesses, location of use (using GPS positioning), file type, tagging and more. In addition to local files, GNOME Activity Journal also organizes web browsing history, email and other data sources.

GNOME Activity Journal was ported to GTK3 and Python3 in version 1.0.0. It is available as part of Debian, Fedora, Arch Linux (AUR) and Ubuntu.

== History ==
GNOME Activity Journal's inclusion in GNOME 3.0 was initially rejected with the provided reason being that it did not integrate well in the whole desktop and looked more like a standalone application, but that decision was revisited at the GNOME Boston Summit and integration with GNOME is once again planned.

Ubuntu shipped Zeitgeist as a standard part of their new desktop environment, Unity, in Ubuntu 11.04. Gnome Activity Journal is not shipped by default, but the Unity Dash makes use of Zeitgeist.

== Screenshots ==
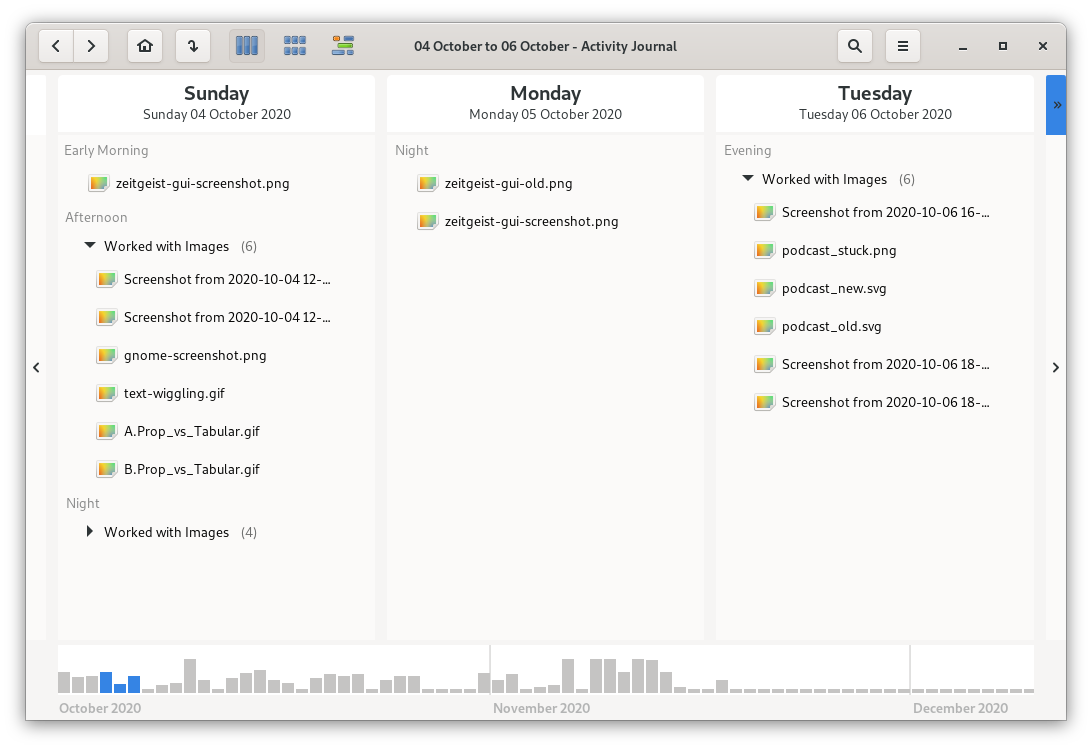
Main Activities View

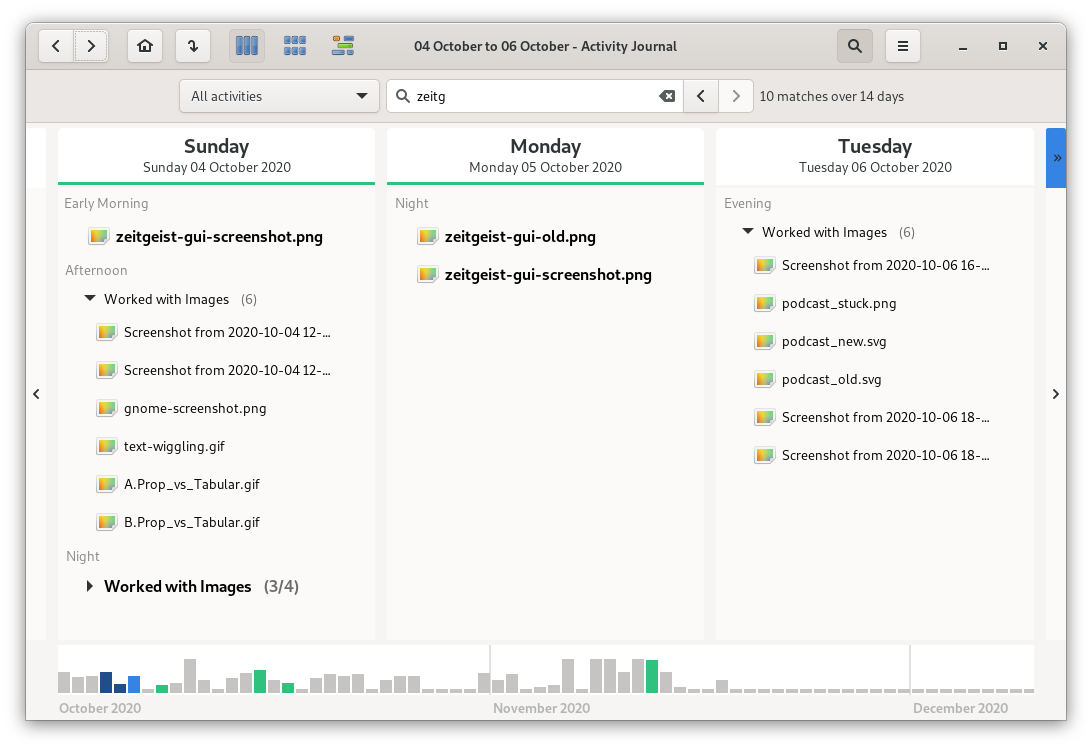
Search Activities

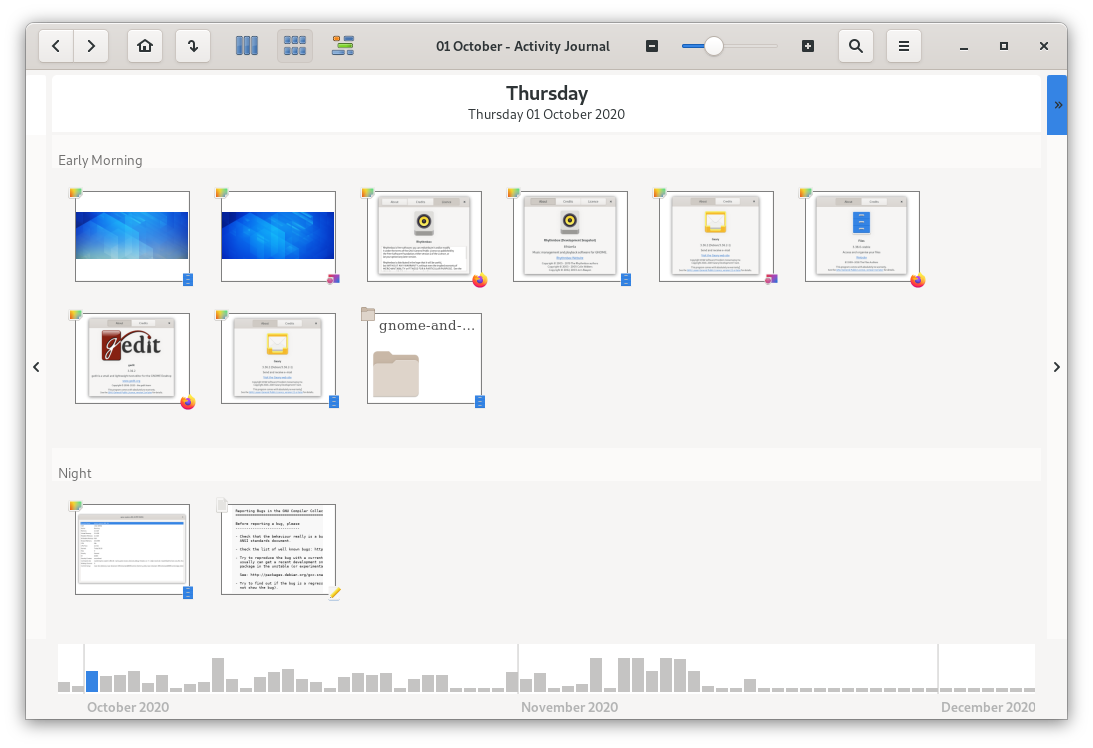
Activities Thumbnail

== See also ==
- Zeitgeist (software)
- Windows Recall
