= Strigi =

File indexing and file search framework

- Developers: Jos van den Oever; Flavio Castelli
- Final release: 0.7.8 / February 5, 2013; 12 years ago
- Repository: anongit.kde.org/strigi.git
- Written in: C++
- Operating system: Linux
- Type: Search tool
- License: LGPL
- Website: sourceforge.net/projects/strigi

Strigi was a file indexing and file search framework (see desktop search) adopted by KDE SC. Strigi was initiated by Jos van den Oever. Strigi's goals are to be fast, use a small amount of RAM, and use flexible backends and plug-ins. A benchmark as of January 2007 showed that Strigi is faster and uses less memory than other search systems, but it lacks many of their features. Like most desktop search systems, Strigi can extract information from files, such as the length of an audio clip, the contents of a document, or the resolution of a picture; plugins determine what filetypes it is capable of handling. Strigi uses its own Jstream system which allows for deep indexing of files. Strigi is accessible via Konqueror, or by clicking on its icon, after adding it to KDE's Kicker or GNOME Panel. (In GNOME desktop, it is called the Deskbar applet.) The graphical user interface (GUI) is named Strigiclient.

It was replaced with Recoll in KDE5 Plasma desktop environment.

== Features ==
- SHA-1 hash for every file indexed to find duplicates
- As of July, 2007 Strigi supports indexing the contents of plain text, PDF, MP3, archives, Debian and RPM packages, and OASIS OpenDocument text (odt), spreadsheet (ods) and presentation (odp) files
- D-Bus and socket support for communication between the daemon and search program
- Small memory footprint
- Xesam query language support
- Very portable, currently runs on Linux, Solaris, FreeBSD, Mac OS X and Windows
- Pluggable backend: Lucene and HyperEstraier, SQLite and Xapian backends are being worked on
- inotify and synchronization to filesystem are being attempted.
- Strigi's indexing can be stopped manually, and will suspend itself if running on a laptop's batteries, disk drive runs out of space, and/or runs in the background until the CPU is not busy with tasks that the computer-user is waiting on the CPU for.

== Operating systems and desktops ==
Strigi used to be a core component of the KDE Software Compilation's semantic desktop. Strigi and NEPOMUK used to work together to help create a semantic desktop search. NEPOMUK allows the user to add metadata, which Strigi would index for a more precise search. It has since been replaced with a home-grown solution, the nepomuk-metadata-extractor.

GNOME has an optional applet to search for files using Strigi, named Deskbar. Deskbar is included in the GNOME desktop of Ubuntu 8.10, for example.

== See also ==
- List of desktop search engines
