= TinySPARQL =

File indexing and search software

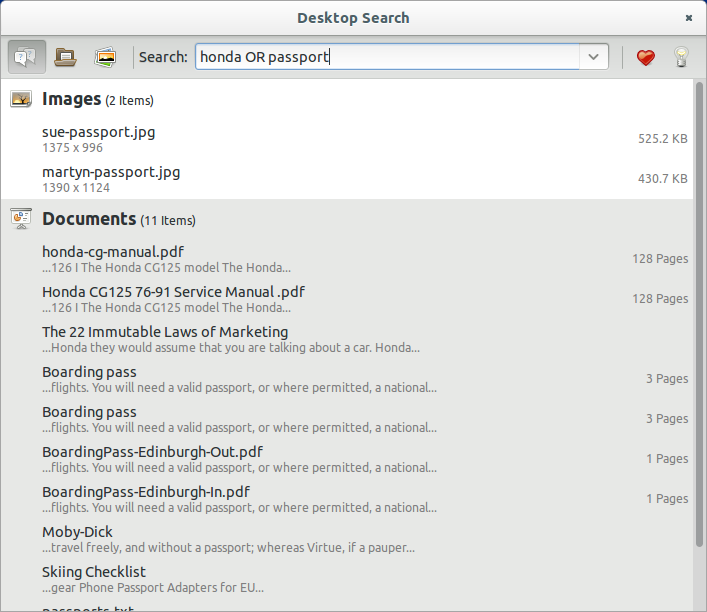
- TinySPARQL/LocalSearch in 2014 (as GNOME Tracker)
- Written in: C
- Operating system: Unix-like systems (Linux and others)
- Type: Search tool
- Website: tinysparql.org
- Repository: gitlab.gnome.org/GNOME/tinysparql

TinySPARQL and its client LocalSearch (formerly collectively known as Tracker or MetaTracker) are a file indexing and search framework for Linux and other Unix-like systems. It is written in the C programming language.

In July 2024 the maintainers renamed the Tracker SPARQL library to TinySPARQL and the Tracker Miners indexer to LocalSearch.

TinySPARQL has been adopted by the GNOME desktop environment and is heavily integrated into GNOME Shell and GNOME Files.

At its core, TinySPARQL is a general-purpose SPARQL-based database; although it is developed together with the file indexer component, it may be used to store or access any kind of data that follows the RDF data model (such as querying Wikidata).

== See also ==
- Strigi
- NEPOMUK
- Baloo (software)
- WinFS
- Desktop search
- List of desktop search engines
- locate
