= Dolphin (file manager) =

File manager for KDE desktop environment

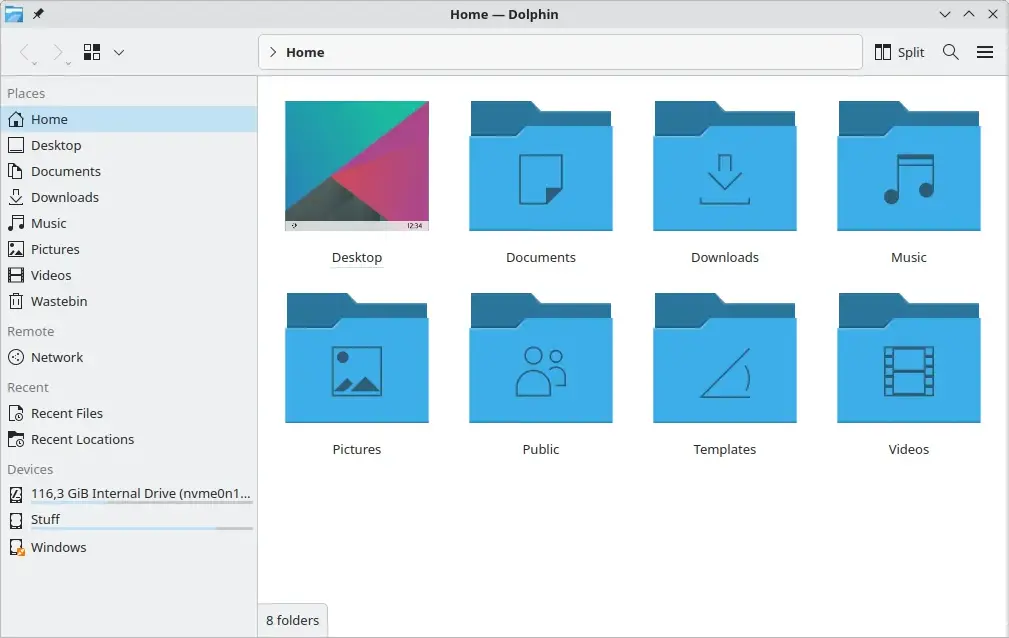
- Dolphin 25.04.0
- Original author: Peter Penz
- Developer: KDE
- Release: 2006; 20 years ago
- Stable release: 25.04.0 / 10 April 2025
- Preview release: 24.01.85 (December 20, 2023; 2 years ago) [±]
- Written in: C++ (Qt)
- Operating system: Unix-like, Windows
- Type: File browser
- License: GPL-2.0-or-later
- Website: apps.kde.org/dolphin/
- Repository: invent.kde.org/system/dolphin

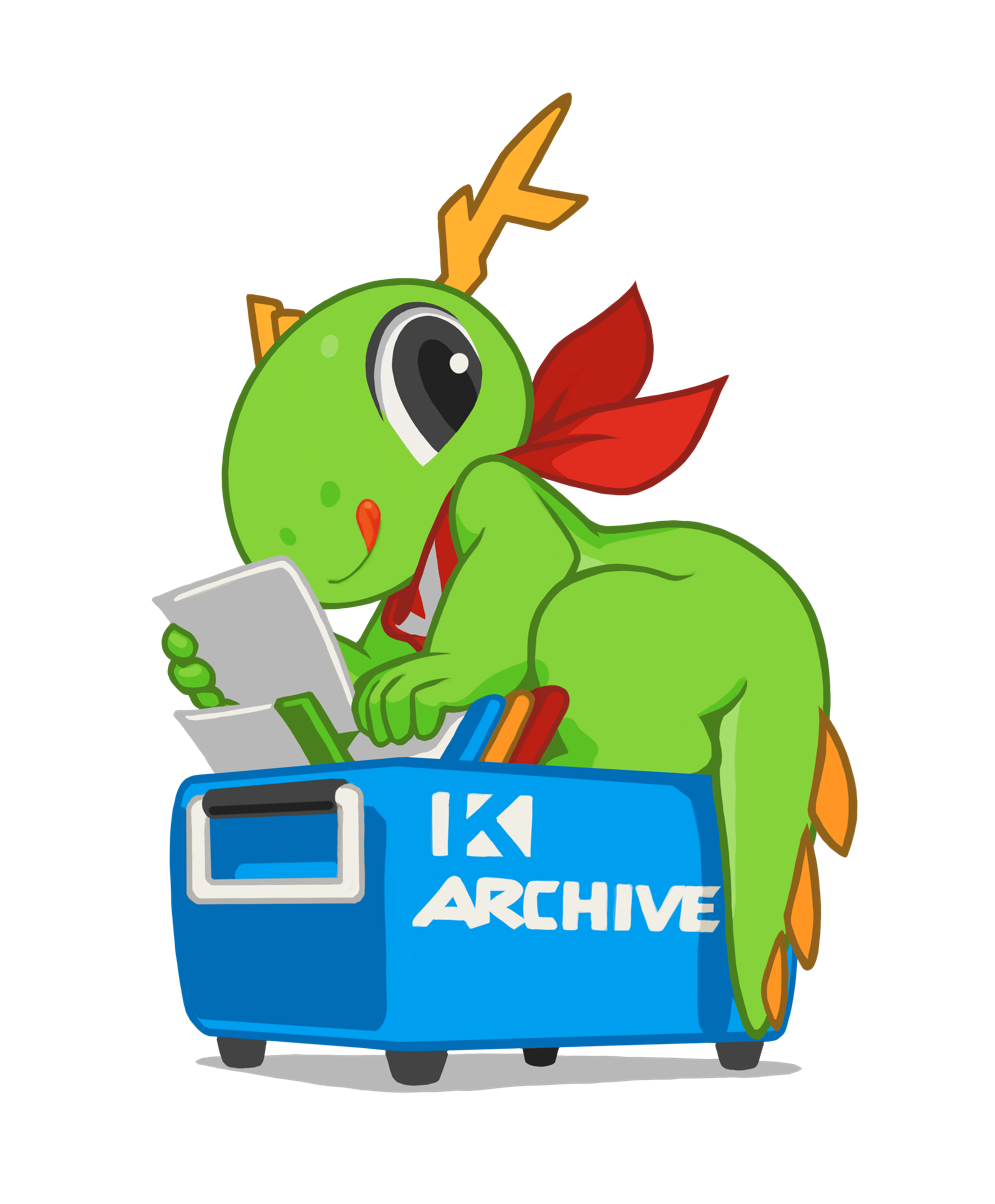
KDE mascot Konqi managing files.

Dolphin is a free and open source file manager included in the KDE Applications bundle. Dolphin had become the default file manager of the KDE Plasma desktop environments in the fourth iteration, termed KDE Software Compilation 4. It can also be optionally installed on K Desktop Environment 3. It replaces Konqueror as the default file manager for KDE SC 4, but Konqueror can still be used as an alternative file manager.

== History ==
Under previous K Desktop Environment versions, Konqueror had served both as the default file manager and web browser. However, for many years users had been critical of Konqueror as being too complex for simple file navigation. As a response, the two functions were divided into two separate applications. Under KDE SC 4, Dolphin was streamlined for browsing files, while sharing as much code as possible with Konqueror. Konqueror continues to be developed primarily as a web browser.

In 2014, work started on porting Dolphin to KDE Frameworks 5. A Frameworks 5-based version was released as part of KDE Applications 15.08 in August 2015. It was ported to Qt 6 and this version was released as a part of KDE Plasma 6 on 28 February 2024.

== Dolphin and K Desktop Environment 3 ==
As development of the KDE SC 4 version was underway, the K Desktop Environment 3 version of Dolphin was discontinued. However, the program continues to be unofficially available for K Desktop Environment 3 under the slightly modified name of “D3lphin”. D3lphin contains many bugfixes and a new sidebar and is maintained by the TDE project.

== Features ==
- Breadcrumb navigation bar – each part of the URL is clickable
- 3 view modes (Icons, Details and Compact), remembered for each folder (configurable)
- File Previews
- Split views (for copying and moving files)
- Network transparency – using KDE’s KIO slaves
- Undo/Redo functionality
- Tabbed navigation
- Renaming of a variable number of selected items in one step
- Baloo (file indexer) integration, which includes
  - File search
  - Tagging, rating and commenting files
- Places bar which also integrates with the Kickoff launcher menu's “Computer” tab
- Sorting and grouping of files by name, size, type and others

=== Networking ===
- Dolphin supports various network protocols (e.g., FTP, SFTP, SMB) for accessing files on remote servers or network-attached storage (NAS) devices.

== Gallery ==
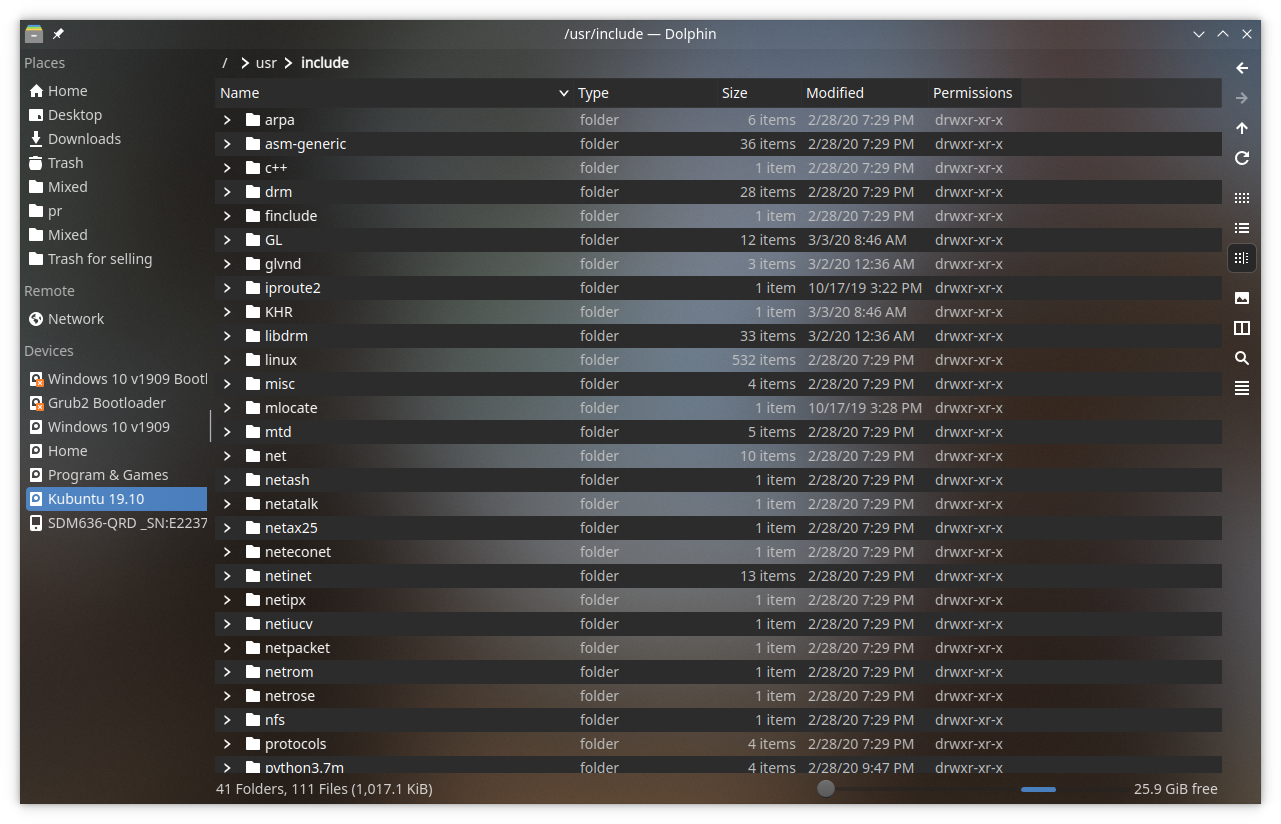
Dolphin 19.04 with modified theme. Panels are displaced from their default position.

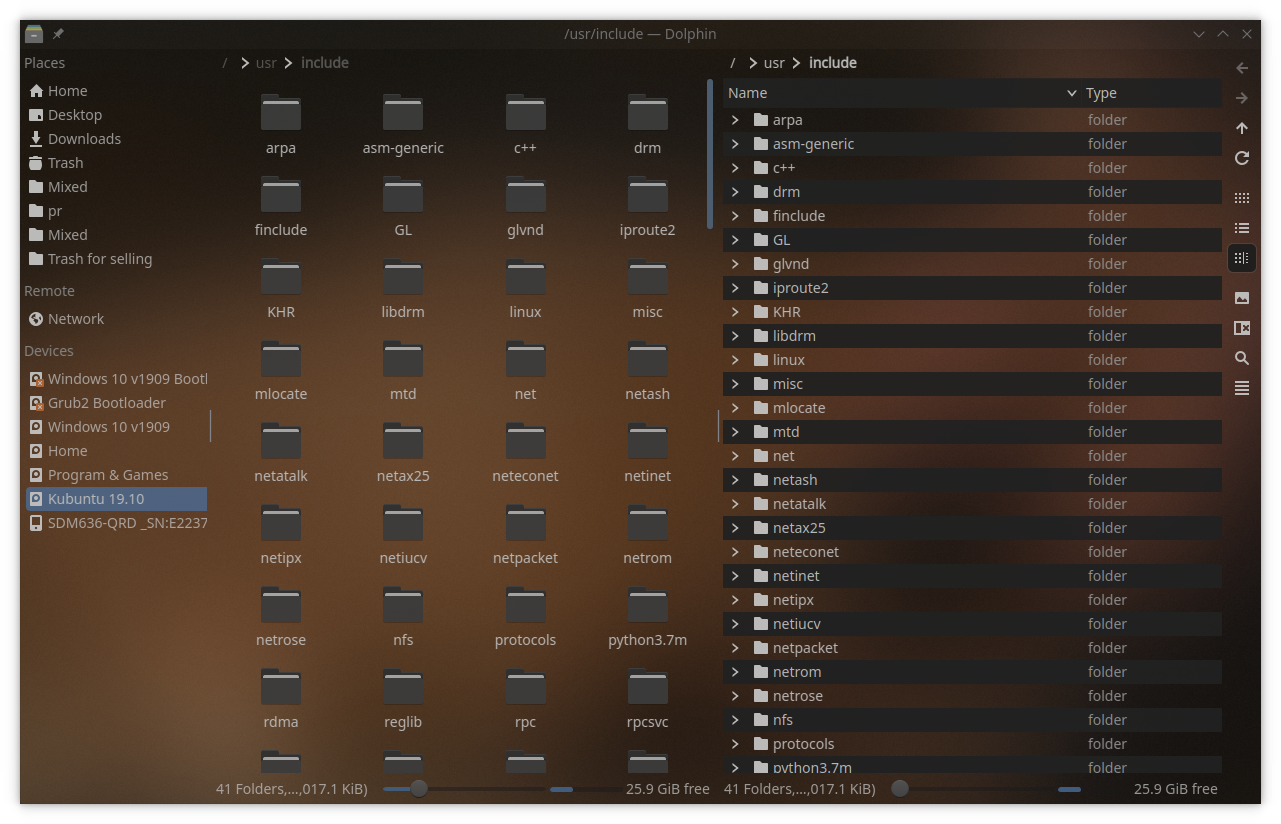
Dolphin 19.04 in split Mode.

== See also ==
- Krusader - two-panel (orthodox) file manager for KDE
- Comparison of file managers
- GNOME Files - GNOME counterpart
- Total Commander - Windows third party file manager
