= Deth Specula =

Rock Band

Deth Specula is a Santa Cruz "neo-bronto" five-piece rock band. Deth Specula was one of the first ten bands on The Internet Underground Music Archive and used the Internet to broadcast a live music concert from the Cowell Courtyard at the SCO Forum held on the University of California, Santa Cruz on August 23, 1994. This was the first time a live music concert was broadcast over the Internet and the second netcast ever. The first song ever broadcast in a live concert over the Internet was "Internet Band", a Deth Specula parody of the Grand Funk Railroad song "We're An American Band".

== Genre ==
Deth Specula was a 1990s band with roots in early 1970s hard rock and style drawing on 1980s punk pop. They began as a punk parody band and later developed into "neo-bronto" rock.

== Band members ==
- Tim Ruckle / Timmy Rotarian - Lead vocals
- Kameran Kashani / Malcom McCameron - Lead guitar
- Marty Stevens / Kozmo - Rhythm guitar and vocals
- Jon Luini / yam - Bass and vocals
- Robert Boucher / rAsTRo! - Drums and percussion
- Eric Davis / Sharky - Engineer

The bassist, Jon Luini is one of the three founders of the Internet Underground Music Archive (IUMA), a pioneering online music website formed in 1993.

== History ==
Deth Specula formed in 1989 to create a rock video parody of the Sex Pistols song Anarchy in the U.K. called "Anarchy at SCO" for use in the SCO Follies, a company sponsored musical comedy revue produced each year by the employees. Deth Specula continued to make video parodies for the SCO Follies in subsequent years and branched out into playing at local night clubs. On March 9, 1994 CNN used the Deth Specula original "Careening Continental" as the lead in and out for their "Showbiz News" segment on IUMA. On August 23, 1994, the band broadcast a live concert over the Mbone. In 1995 they played in the UniForum Battle of the Bands in Dallas, Texas.

Over time Deth Specula became more of an original rock and ballad band than a parody group although they retained their sense of humor as evidenced by originals like "Baboon Liver", "Crop Killer", "Reagan Mask", "Gutterslut", and "Get Even More".

== Current status ==
Deth Specula performed at the Cocoanut Grove in Santa Cruz, California on February 2, 2008, for the Bruce Steinberg memorial. It's A Beautiful Day opened for them.

Deth Specula is currently not performing.

== Discography ==
- Weasels and Cream - an 8-song cassette
- A 3-song demo tape
- The Deth Specula Compilation Video - music videos including "Anarchy at SCO", a parody of the Sex Pistols song "Anarchy in the U.K."

== See also ==
- Santa Cruz Operation
- Multicast backbone (Mbone)
- Internet Underground Music Archive
- Severe Tire Damage (band)
