= Santa Cruz Operation =

Software company based in Santa Cruz, California

The Santa Cruz Operation, Inc.
- Type: Private (until 1993); Public (after 1993)
- Traded as: Nasdaq: SCOC
- Industry: Computer software
- Founded: 1979
- Founder: Larry Michels; Doug Michels
- Defunct: 2001
- Fate: 2001, sold off Unix assets and renamed as Tarantella, Inc.
- Successor: Tarantella, Inc.
- Headquarters: Santa Cruz, California, United States
- Number of locations: Murray Hill, New Jersey; Toronto, Canada; Watford, England; Cambridge, England; Leeds, England; many regional offices
- Key people: Larry Michels; Lars Turndal; Alok Mohan; Doug Michels
- Products: Xenix; SCO UNIX; SCO OpenDesktop; SCO OpenServer; UnixWare; Vision97; Tarantella
- Revenue: $224 million (peak, 1999)
- Number of employees: 1,300 (peak, 1991)
- Website: sco.com

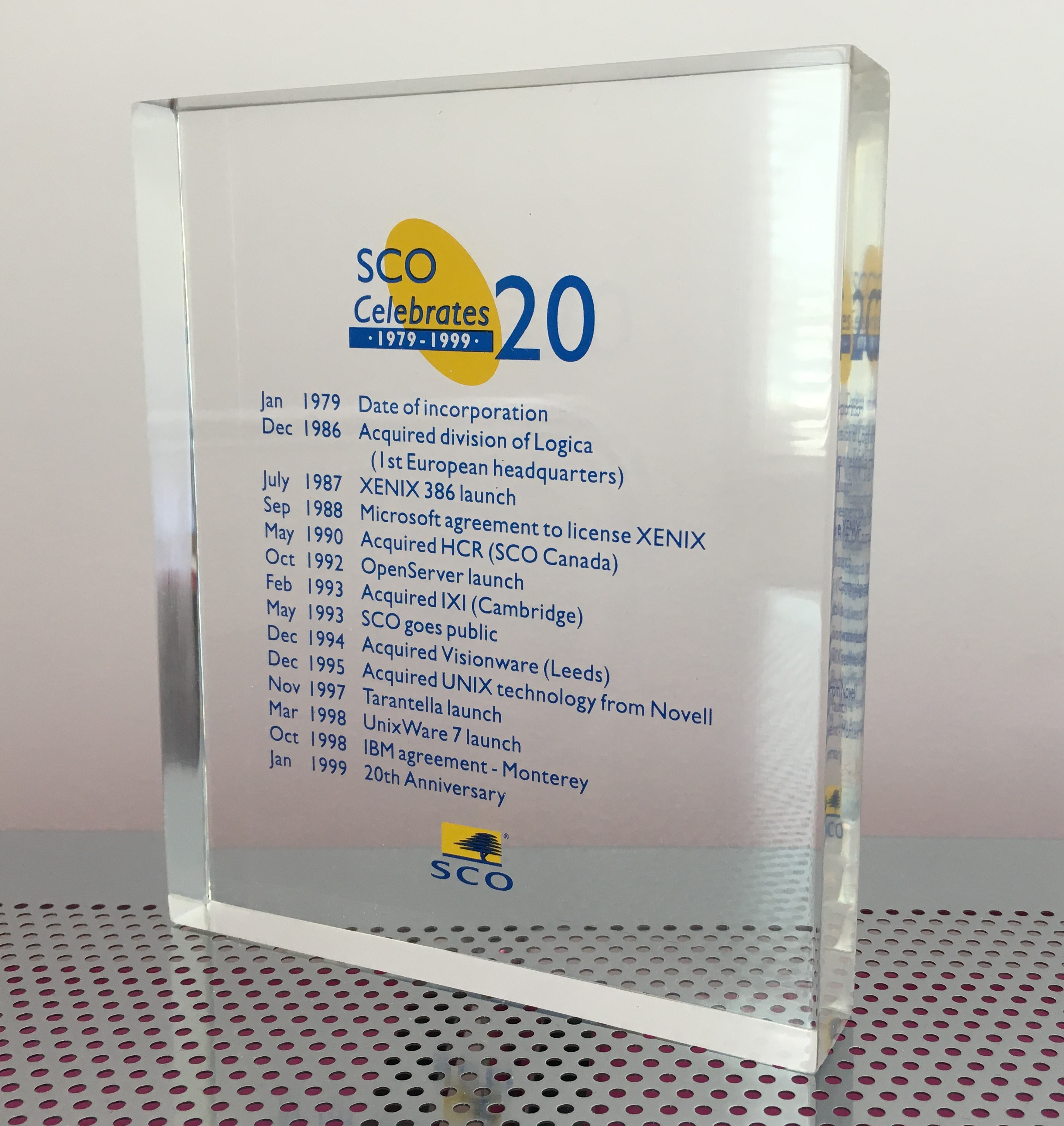
Commemorative plaque celebrating twenty years in business for Santa Cruz Operation, listing important milestones along the way

The Santa Cruz Operation, Inc. (usually known as SCO, pronounced either as individual letters or as a word) was an American software company, based in Santa Cruz, California, that was best known for selling three Unix operating system variants for Intel x86 processors: Xenix, SCO UNIX (later known as SCO OpenDesktop and SCO OpenServer), and UnixWare.

SCO was founded in 1979 by Larry Michels and his son Doug Michels and began as a consulting and Unix porting company. An early involvement with Microsoft led to SCO making a product out of Xenix on Intel-based PCs. The fundamental insight that led to SCO's success was that there was a large market for a standard, "open systems" operating system on commodity microprocessor hardware that would give business applications computing power and throughput that previously was only possible with considerably more expensive minicomputers. SCO built a large community of value-added resellers that would eventually become 15,000 strong and many of its sales to small and medium-sized businesses went through those resellers. This community was exemplified by the annual SCO Forum conference, held in a scenic setting that reflected the company's Santa Cruz culture. SCO also had corporate customers in the replicated sites space, where a SCO-based system was deployed in each of a retail or restaurant chain's stores.

Despite seeing rapid growth in terms of revenues, SCO tended to have high research and development costs and was never consistently profitable either before or after going public in 1993. SCO bought two former Xenix outfits, the Software Products Group within Logica in 1986 and HCR Corporation in 1990, thereby gaining development offices in Watford, England and Toronto, Canada. During the mid-1990s, SCO acquired two further UK companies, IXI Limited in Cambridge and Visionware in Leeds, which led to a suite of client-to-Unix integration products and then the Tarantella product line. SCO's operating system technology moved from Xenix to System V Release 3 as reflected by the products SCO Open Desktop and SCO OpenServer. In 1995, SCO bought the System V Release 4 and UnixWare business from Novell and, in collaboration with several hardware partners, the New Jersey development office it gained in the deal led a series of enhancements to the UnixWare product aimed at the high-end enterprise and data center spaces.

Beginning in the late 1990s, SCO faced increasingly severe competitive pressure, on one side from Microsoft's Windows NT and its successors and on the other side from the free and open source Linux. In 2001, the Santa Cruz Operation sold its rights to Unix and its Unix divisions to Caldera Systems. After that the corporation retained only its Tarantella product line, and changed its name to Tarantella, Inc. Caldera Systems became Caldera International and then changed its name to The SCO Group, which has created some confusion between the two companies. The company described here is the original Santa Cruz Operation. Although generally referred to simply as "SCO" up to 2001, it is now sometimes referred to as "old SCO", "Santa Cruz", or "SCO Classic" to distinguish it from "The SCO Group" to whom the U.S. trademark "SCO" was transferred.

== Early history ==
=== Origin ===
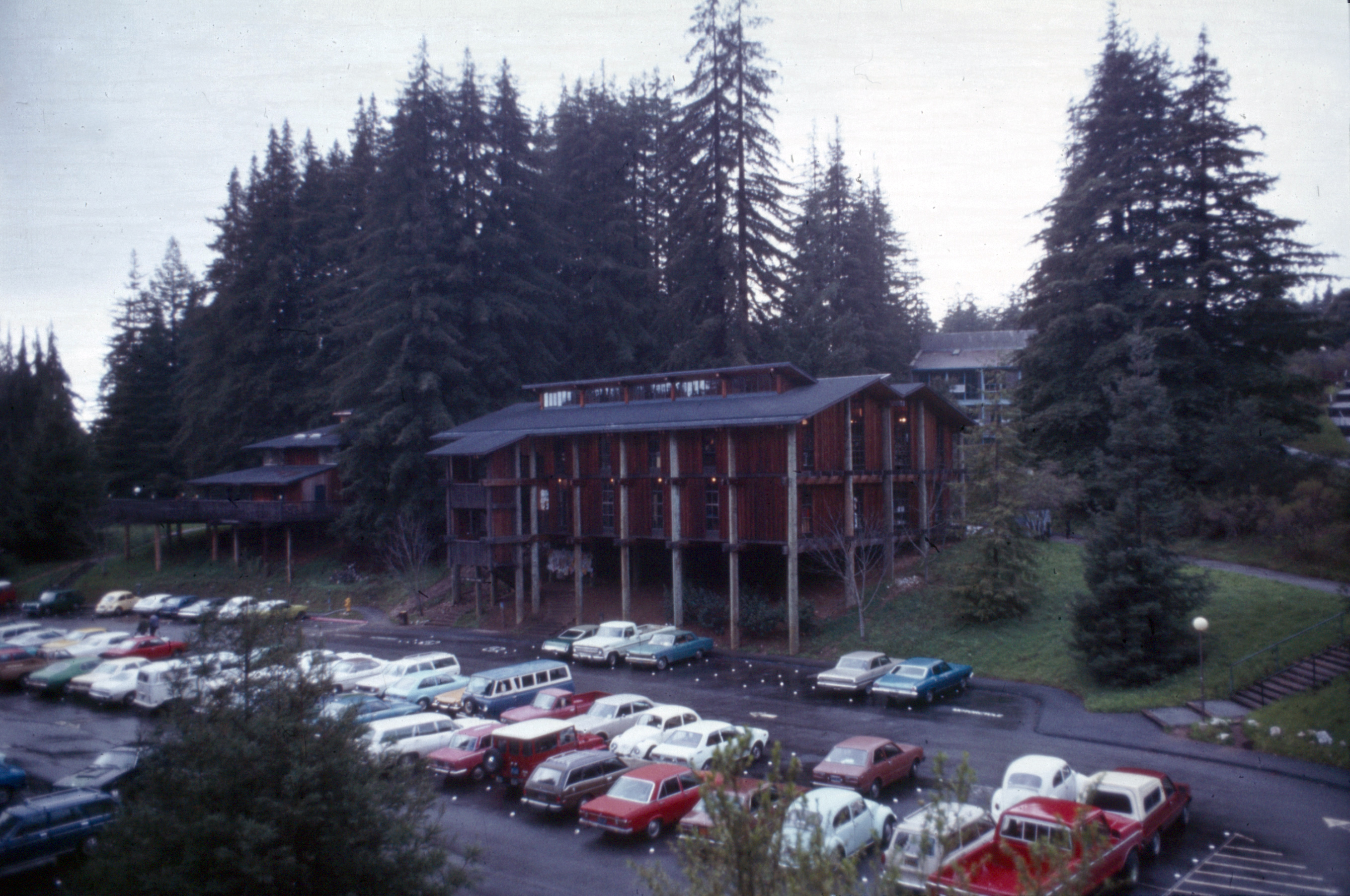
The origins of the company and its culture came in part from the University of California, Santa Cruz, shown here in 1980.

SCO was founded in 1979 in Santa Cruz, California, by Larry Michels and his son Doug Michels as a computer consulting company that focused on both technology and management considerations. Larry Michels, 48 years old at the time, was an electrical engineer who had gone into the aerospace industry in Los Angeles. He had then founded a credit verification company, Credifier Corporation, which he sold to TRW Inc., for whom he subsequently served as a vice president for ten years. (Larry Michels was first cousin of another technology entrepreneur, Allen Michels.) Towards the end of that time, Michels became head of the Advanced Products Laboratory for TRW Electronics, and relocated to Santa Cruz to run it remotely from there.

As part of this, Michels was involved with a telephony business, TRW Vidar. This was a company, based in Mountain View, California, that TRW had acquired and that was a part of TRW Electronics. TRW Vidar was a pioneer in digital telephone switches, and also an early user of Version 6 Unix in its development environment. Michels felt that TRW as a whole did not understand the rapid change that computers were bringing to businesses or what it had with Vidar – "They thought they were buying a telephony business, they thought that telephony was telephony, but they really were computers. Unless you approached them as being computers, you didn't end up with anything." He then left TRW to do management consulting work, thinking, as he later said, that "if TRW was having so much trouble, it was probably an interesting business [helping companies] go about making these transitions." As a result of this connection, some have considered The Santa Cruz Operation to have been an offshoot of TRW Vidar.

Doug Michels, 25 years old at the time, had graduated from the University of California, Santa Cruz in 1976 with a degree from their department of computer and information science. He had then started his own consulting operation, focusing on technical work.

The two saw some commonalities in their consulting endeavors and decided to join forces to reduce overhead. They chose to stay in Santa Cruz both because of the relaxed lifestyle there and because the university would provide a ready supply of technically suitable employees. By some sources The Santa Cruz Operation, Inc. was incorporated in January 1979. The name came from Larry Michels' time as head of the TRW advanced research group, when the remote outpost had been known as 'the Santa Cruz operation'. The Michelses decided to use that for the name of their new firm, and the name was retained in the years that would follow because it told people where they were coming from.

=== Unix porting company ===
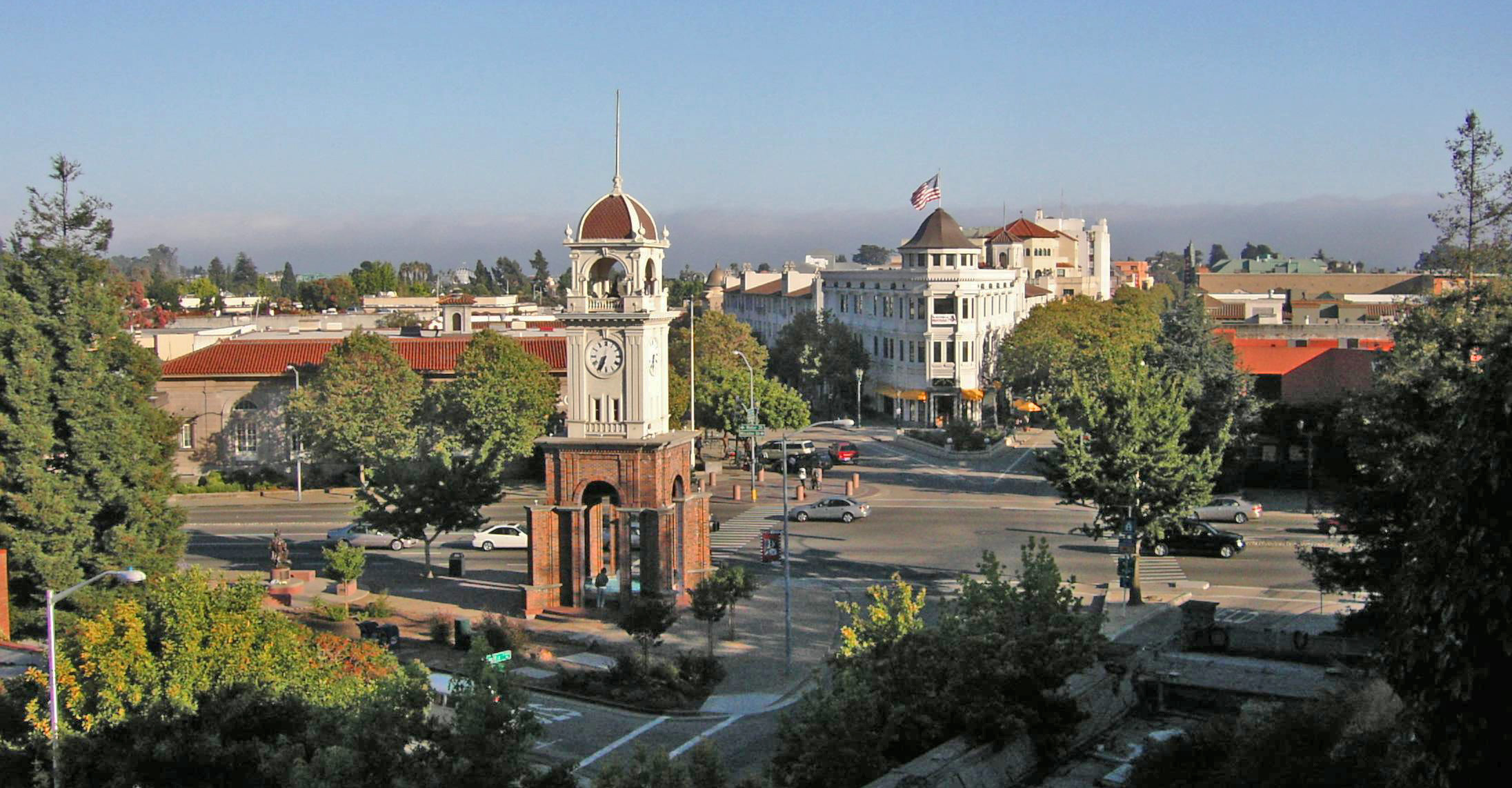
SCO's first offices were in downtown Santa Cruz, about 2/5 of a mile distant along the right side of this viewpoint

Offices for the new firm were established at 500 Chestnut Street in the downtown area of Santa Cruz. But as Doug Michels conceded in a 2006 interview, in terms of what they would be doing, "We didn't really have an idea." Pure consulting work held little ongoing appeal, and the notion of helping large businesses manage rapid technological change proved difficult in practice.

However, the Michelses soon became intrigued by the microprocessor revolution then underway, in which computer systems based on processors such as the Intel 8080 or the Zilog Z80 could be put together much quicker than the minicomputers of the past. In the consulting work they did, SCO was dealing with various resellers and small time-sharing companies in helping those companies formulate their technology strategies. The people at SCO had, and further acquired, a familiarity with the Unix operating system and its potential for use in the business world. By early 1981, SCO was selling a report analyzing Unix features and availability based on a poll it had taken of over sixty members of the /usr/group association.

Moreover, people at SCO realized that since Unix was portable and not controlled by any hardware manufacturer, use of it could allow microprocessor-based system manufacturers to avoid having to develop a proprietary operating system of their own, which they had neither the time nor the expertise to do. Accordingly, the company decided to focus on custom jobs of porting the Unix system and applications that ran on it. Eric S. Raymond, in his book The Art of Unix Programming (which places the start of SCO in 1978), calls SCO the "first Unix company", although Interactive Systems Corporation, which put out the first commercial Unix release (as a base for office automation systems) in 1977, perhaps has a stronger case.

The first Unix-based operating system that SCO made is for the PDP-11, is named DYNIX (not to be confused with a same-named Unix variant later made by Sequent Computer Systems), and is based on Seventh Edition Unix. It supports the Tymshare service and by early 1981 was included in Tymshare's DYNASTY computer system offering. SCO also did a Unix port to the LSI-11 variant of the PDP-11.

Xenix is a Seventh Edition Unix-based version of the operating system that Microsoft worked on, initially for the PDP-11. SCO first began working with Xenix in 1981. In 1982, Microsoft and SCO forged a joint agreement for development and technology exchange, with the two companies' engineers working together on improvements to Xenix. (Microsoft was still a small company at the time, with perhaps 25 or 50 employees.) Microsoft and SCO then further engaged Human Computing Resources in Canada, and the Software Products Group within Logica in the United Kingdom, as part of making further improvements to Xenix and porting Xenix to other platforms. In doing so, Microsoft gave HCR and Logica the rights to do Xenix ports and license Xenix binaries in those territories.

In 1983, SCO made a technically difficult port of Xenix to the unmapped Intel 8086 processor (earlier 8086 Xenix ports required an off-chip MMU) and licensed rights from Microsoft to be able to ship its packaged Unix system, Xenix, for the IBM PC XT. This work takes advantage of earlier porting and compilers work that Altos Computer Systems had done for the mapped 16-bit Intel architecture. The resulting system is binary compatible with, and can run applications built for, Altos Xenix systems, and was a successful venture for SCO.

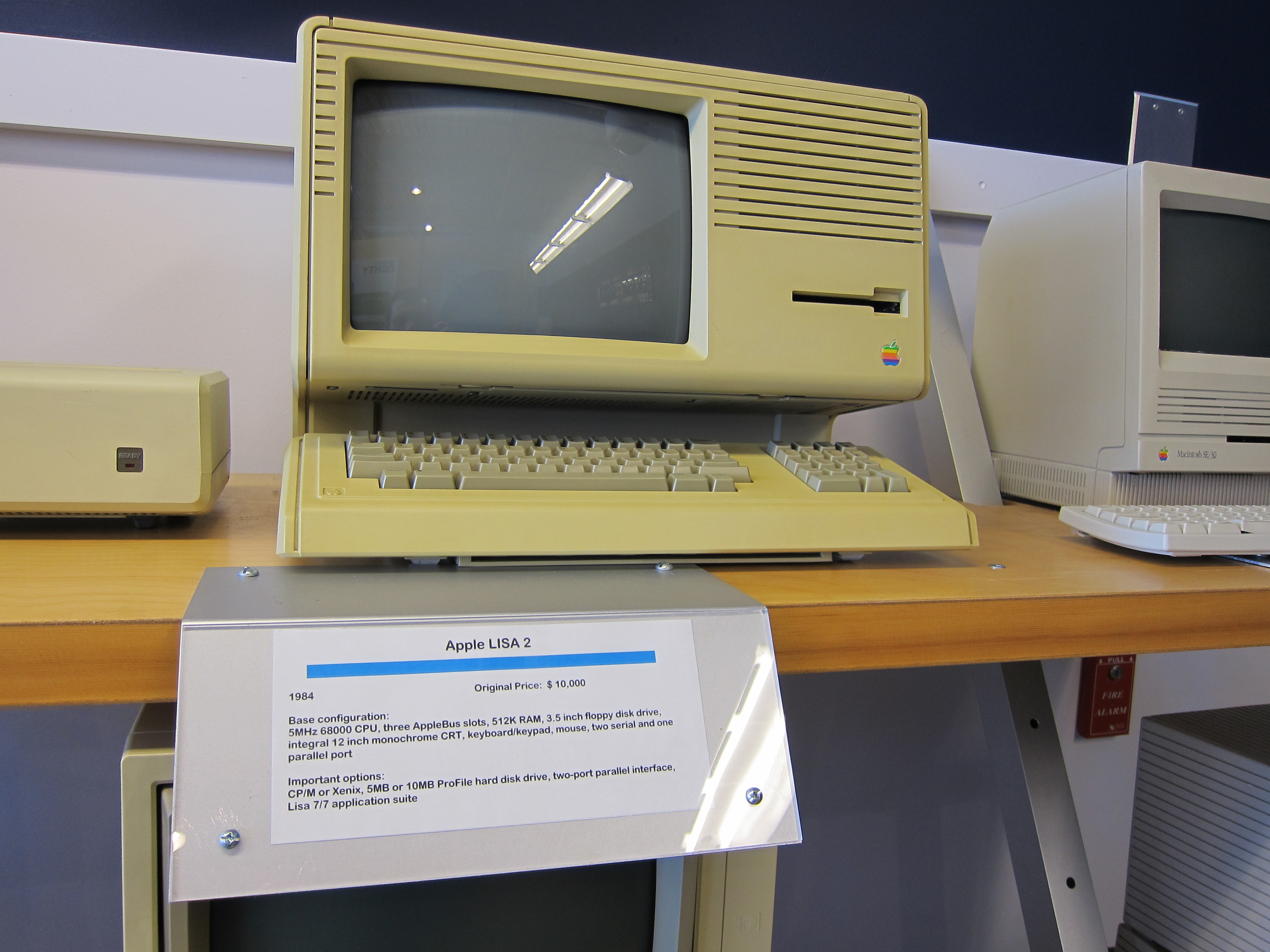
Museum label for the Apple Lisa notes that it could run Xenix; that was SCO's first shrink-wrapped product.

Somewhat in parallel with that, SCO and Microsoft also developed the 68000-based Xenix port for the Apple Lisa. It has multiuser capability as well as support for virtual terminals for single users. SCO also sold applications for Xenix on Lisa, including a Uniplex word processor, the Multiplan spreadsheet from Microsoft, Level II COBOL from Micro Focus, and the Informix database software from Relational Database Systems. While the Lisa was not a success in the personal computer marketplace, its powerful-for-its-price-point processor combined with a relatively inexpensive operating system gave third-party vendors an attractive platform for building systems to compete with minicomputers, and SCO sold several thousand copies of Xenix for the Lisa. This was the first shrink-wrapped binary product sold by SCO, and its sales convinced SCO of the potential of that kind of product.

A third target of SCO's Xenix porting work was the DEC Professional 350. As Larry Michels said in early 1984, "SCO will continue offering custom XENIX adaptions to the large OEM market – the Original Equipment Manufacturers – who make up SCO's established customer base." SCO also sold Unix training.

By September 1983, SCO had around 60 employees and was already expanding into a second office, at 1700 Mission Street in Santa Cruz. While some of SCO's staff had studied computer science, others were coming from backgrounds in linguistics, sociology, psychology, or business.

== Middle history ==
=== Growth years with Xenix on Intel ===
In early 1984, Microsoft and SCO issued a joint announcement about SCO's rights to distribute Xenix within the United States. SCO Xenix for the PC XT shipped sometime in 1984 and contains some enhancements from 4.2BSD Unix, Micnet local area networking, and multiuser support. In 1985, SCO worked with AT&T and Microsoft to test conformance with the System V Interface Definition (SVID), one of the early Unix standardization efforts.

In October 1985, SCO announced the availability of Xenix System V for the Intel 8088-based IBM PC XT and the Intel 80286-based IBM PC AT and IBM PC XT. The product can support ten remote users via serial ports and was sold with optional packages for software development in C or assembly language and for text processing. There had been concern within SCO about the business chances of the 80286 product, since IBM had elected to come to market with their own Unix. But that IBM effort, contracted to Interactive Systems Corporation and called PC/IX, resulted in a product that was unsuccessful.

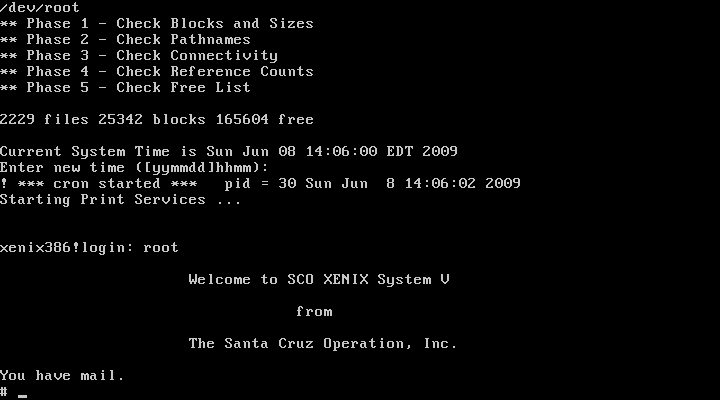
SCO Xenix System V boot-up screen

There had been considerable skepticism in the industry that Unix could ever establish a successful market position on the PC. These included beliefs that Unix was inherently large and complex enough that it needed a minicomputer, the platform on which it had been developed, in order to run effectively. As Larry Michels said in early January 1991, "We had all the problems of being ahead of the market." The company had never been adequately funded, as venture capitalists were unenthused by the idea of Unix on a PC; cash flow problems resulted and the Michelses used much of their personal savings to keep the company in business. A key turning point was when Compaq Computer began shipping systems with Unix installed and chose SCO to be their provider.

Larry Michels tended to focus on the business aspects of the company while Doug Michels focused on technology facets; together they became recognized as pioneers of the Unix-on-PC industry. Larry Michels was president of SCO and Doug Michels was, as Larry put it, "the number-two person", usually with the title of executive vice-president, but both employees and outside investors were encouraged to treat the two as an indivisible team.

In December 1986, SCO acquired the Software Products Group division of Logica. It became a wholly owned subsidiary, the Santa Cruz Operation Limited, and the basis for SCO's UK operation, with its office subsequently being relocated first to Soho and then to Watford outside London. By 1993, almost half of SCO's revenues came from outside North America, and of that, almost half came from the United Kingdom.

In 1987, the company brought out the SCO Xenix 386 Toolkit, which allowed developers to start coding applications and device drivers for the new Intel 80386 processor in addition to the existing 80286. Later that year, SCO's full release of Xenix for 80386 was made; the chip was powerful enough that Xenix running on it could handle some 30 different users. SCO provided some basic applications with Xenix. But the real value came from the 1,700 other applications that had been developed by value-added resellers (VARs) and independent software vendors (ISVs) for the platform, including such domains as auto parts management, medical accounting, bakery process control, and many others. As one retrospective look characterized it, Xenix served "as a workhorse for small businesses – places where you might find a dozen or so dumb terminals and a couple of printers plugged into a system running [a] small database system. It's simple, small and stable."

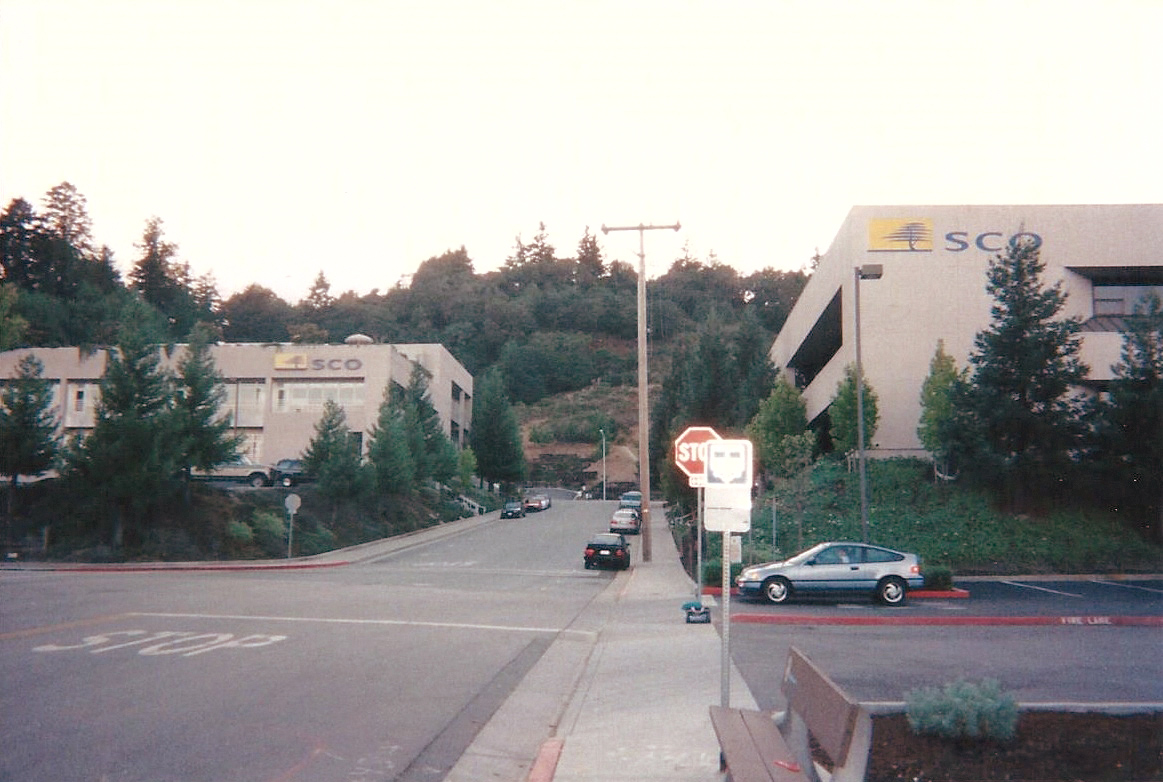
The main SCO offices, at 425 (left) and 400 Encinal Street in the Harvey West area of Santa Cruz, California, as seen in 1997. Behind the buildings are the hills and Pogonip trails.

By early 1987, SCO had relocated its offices to a building at 400 Encinal Street in an industrial park in the Harvey West area of Santa Cruz (the building had been previously occupied by Intel). As of a year later, SCO employed some 500 people, mostly in Santa Cruz, and had plans to build a new office building there. By early 1991, that new building, 425 Encinal Street, was holding an open house event for prospective employees. The company subsequently established offices in several other buildings in the Harvey West area. These included 324 Encinal Street, 150 Dubois Street, and 100 Pioneer Street.

By the late 1980s, fed by strong computer science program that emphasized Unix design and a robust internship program at SCO, some 50 to 60 percent of SCO employees were UC Santa Cruz graduates. SCO now employed some 800 people overall, mostly in its Santa Cruz offices but also in the UK office and in one in Washington, D.C. By early 1989, SCO had sold some 350,000 copies of Xenix in total, mostly through its channel. The company was achieving what the Santa Cruz Sentinel termed "explosive growth".

SCO would subsequently reorient its product on a later technology base. However Xenix comprised the largest installed base of any of the early commercial variants of Unix; it remained a good seller among some customers and SCO releases of Xenix continued until Xenix/386 version 2.3.4 was put out in 1991.

=== Relations with Microsoft ===
Microsoft's level of commitment to Xenix was always viewed with some suspicion within the industry. It later became clear that by the mid-1980s, Microsoft was losing interest in Xenix from their own business perspective, both due to the cost of licensing it from AT&T and because MS-DOS was rapidly taking off as a product.

In February 1989, it was announced that Microsoft was taking a minority investment in SCO by buying an amount less than 20 percent of that company. The terms of the agreement, which were not publicly disclosed, provided SCO with funds that it acutely needed in order to continue to expand in its rapidly growing market. The deal put a Microsoft executive on SCO's board of directors; that executive, Microsoft's chief financial officer Frank Gaudette, would play an important role in guiding SCO to become a mature enterprise. The deal contained provisions to prevent Microsoft from exercising dominant control over the smaller SCO. By some accounts, the Microsoft board member often had to be asked to leave discussions when the topic became how SCO could best compete with Microsoft. Already on the board since 1987 was another Microsoft veteran, Jim Harris, who had been a leader of Microsoft's OEM sales efforts.

We had a very long relationship with Microsoft. We were partners, we were competitors, they invested in us, at one point they owned [around 20 percent] of the company, we licensed technology from them, we had lawsuits with them, we had every type of relationship with Microsoft you can imagine.

— Doug Michels, 2012.

Microsoft's motivation for the purchase has been variously explained as a desire to keep a Xenix technology partner, as a hedge against the growth of Unix, and as a hedge against the Open Software Foundation. Yet another explanation was the one given by Larry Michels in 1991, making reference to the SCO Unix product then being sold: "The paradox is if you were Microsoft, Open Desktop isn't something you want to see succeed. But if it doesn't, something else will, and they would rather see Open Desktop than whatever that would be. We pay them royalties."

Later figures stating the amount that Microsoft actually owned included 16 percent, 14 percent, and 11 percent. Microsoft did not fully exit its position in SCO until 2000.

In any case, intellectual property rights were not transferred in the 1989 agreement and SCO would continue to pay Microsoft royalties for Xenix and Unix technologies. Not until 1997 was SCO able to reach an agreement with Microsoft that relieved SCO of the obligation to include Microsoft code, and pay royalties on that code regardless of whether it was used or not, in SCO products. And that only came after SCO filed a complaint against Microsoft for violating European Union competition law, a complaint that was ruled valid by the European Commission.

=== SCO UNIX and Open Desktop ===
Needing to create a product from a more recent branch from the Unix family tree, Unix System V Release 3, SCO, together with Microsoft and Interactive Systems Corporation, worked during 1987 and 1988 to develop the System V/386 Release 3.2 version, which adds the ability to run existing Xenix binary applications on System V without requiring recompilation. This capability makes use of the new Intel Binary Compatibility Standard (iBCS), developed by Intel, AT&T, and SCO. The AT&T release of System V/386 Release 3.2 was announced at SCO Forum in 1988, but further work was needed by SCO to incorporate Xenix device drivers before SCO could release it as a product.

SCO UNIX, full name SCO UNIX System V/386 Release 3.2.0, had first customer ship in June 1989; this became the basis for commercial successor to SCO Xenix. Based on an agreement forged with AT&T the previous year, it was also the first SCO operating system to carry the 'Unix' word itself in the product name.

View source data.
SCO revenues by year (in millions of dollars)

In early 1990, the integrated product SCO Open Desktop began shipping. It features on top of SCO UNIX System V/386 several critical functionalities: a graphical user interface based on the X Window System and Open Software Foundation Motif toolkit; TCP/IP networking; support for the NFS network file system and OS/2 LAN Manager; database support; and Merge 386 for running DOS-based applications. Regarding OSF Motif, this is its first appearance in a commercial product, and Open Desktop became the first graphical Unix for an Intel 32-bit processor that was packaged in shrink-wrapped form.

SCO used technology partners for much of this work. The graphical desktop itself is the X.desktop one from IXI Limited; The TCP/IP networking stack and NFS implementation come from Lachman Associates, while Open Systems Interconnection software comes from Retix, Inc. The relational database manager included is Ingres. The Merge functionality comes from Locus Computing Corporation.

Version 3.2.2 of SCO Unix and Open Desktop came out in mid-1990; it contains various fixes and improvements for problems found in the field. However, Open Desktop did not make inroads on the personal computer market, as SCO Unix's system resource requirements were strenuous and there were few commonly used PC applications available for it.

Beginning in the late 1980s, AT&T and Sun Microsystems worked on a merge of Xenix, BSD, SunOS, and System V Release 3 features, with the result being known as UNIX System V Release 4. SCO UNIX and Open Desktop remained based on System V Release 3, but eventually added home-grown versions of a number of the features of Release 4.

Initially supplemented by some engineers who transferred from SCO's headquarters operation in Santa Cruz, the ex-Logica group in Watford became one of the major development sites for SCO and over the next few years did the operating system kernel development work behind the subsequent SCO OpenDesktop and SCO OpenServer product releases. It later did engineering work in networking, security, escalations, and other areas, in addition to being the sales, marketing, and customer engineering hub for SCO's EMEA region.

SCO acquired the Toronto, Canada-based HCR Corporation in 1990. Since their interactions in the early Xenix days, HCR had become Canada's leading commercial Unix platform developer. The HCR acquisition allowed SCO to improve its development tools offerings, especially for Open Desktop. SCO Canada took over work on the Microsoft C compiler that dates back to Xenix days but can produce binaries for either Xenix or Unix. In addition, the SCO Open Desktop Development System also offers the AT&T pcc compiler, here called rcc, but it can only compile for Unix. SCO Canada continued to sell HCR's Cfront-based C++ product, which by 1991 had an estimated 450 licensed sites using it. The Toronto site also took on some porting and integration work.

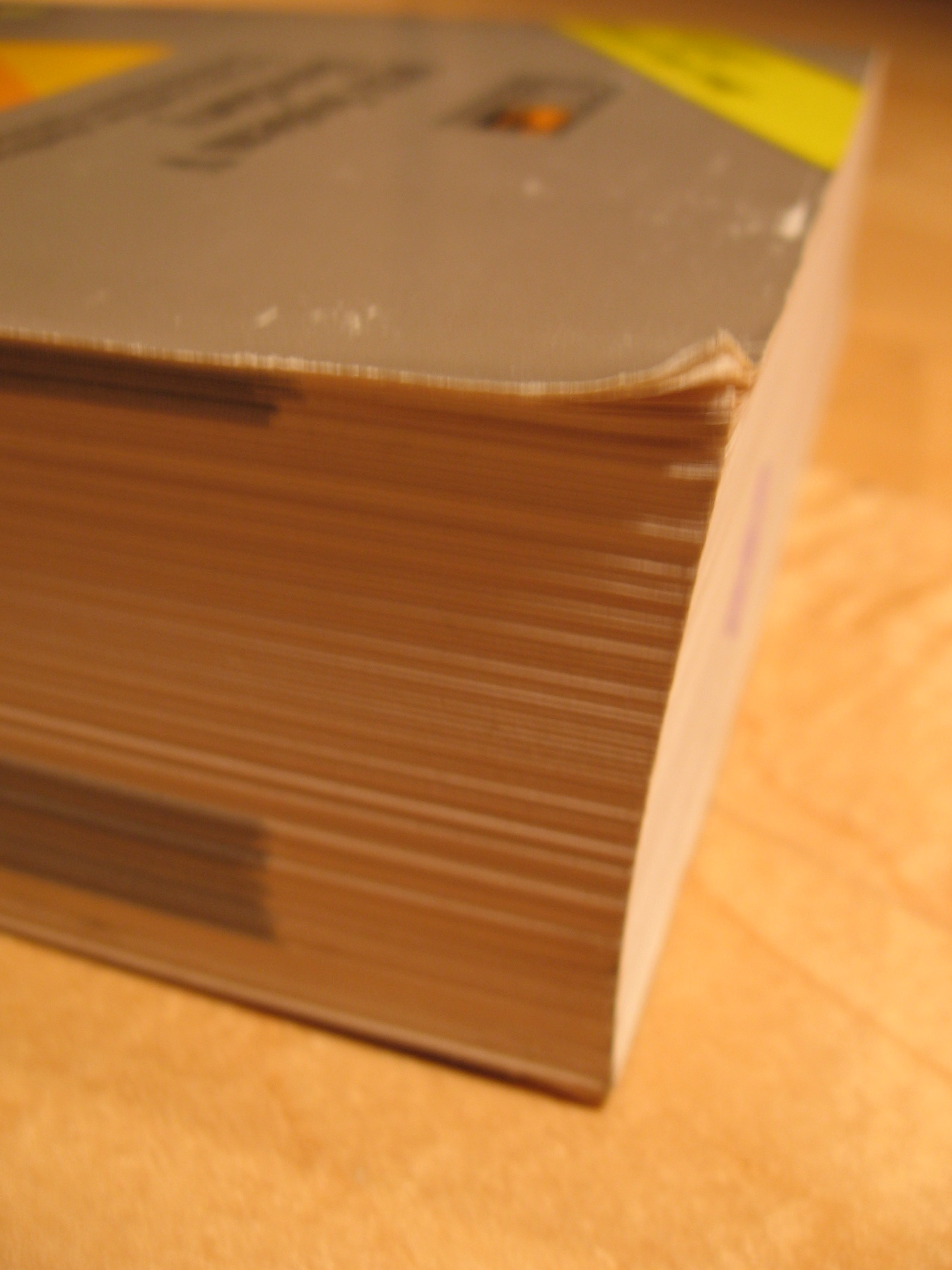
A thick volume: Guide to Software, Hardware, and Services for the SCO System V Environment, 1990

SCO had a large technical publications operation at this time, with substantial staffing in each of the Santa Cruz, Toronto, and Watford offices, who as a group published on the order of 30,000 pages of documentation on a 18-month release cycle. One of the tech writers at Watford from 1991 to 1995 was science-fiction author Charles Stross, and his experiences in that office would provide some of the setting for his 2000s work The Atrocity Archives.

Collectively, Xenix and SCO UNIX became the most installed flavor of Unix due to the popularity of the x86 architecture. Hardware manufacturers that manufactured Intel-based systems and that resold a SCO operating system on it included not just Compaq but also DEC, Tandy Computers, Siemens Nixdorf, Olivetti, Unisys, and Hewlett-Packard. Especially significant were those systems with multiprocessor capability, such as the Compaq SystemPro, for which the SCO MPX multiprocessor extension to SCO UNIX had been delivered in 1990 based on development work that SCO did in conjunction with the firm Corollary, Inc. This effort produced the first version of Unix to support the symmetric multiprocessing capability of Compaq's.

The primary market segment for SCO Unix was small businesses, such as real estate offices or florists to take two examples, where specialized dealers who were familiar with a particular application domain built or assembled customized software for that domain and then sold that as a turnkey solution to the business. SCO Unix was also used by chains such as Radio Shack and Taco Bell.

SCO revised logo, introduced in 1991, featured a new tagline emphasizing the "open systems" movement that it advocated.

SCO capitalized on the increasingly prevalent "open systems" movement of the time, which held that a combination of interoperability, portability, and open software standards should result in computer users should not being locked into any one computer company's product. Moreover, Doug Michels became an effective and convincing advocate for the open systems idea. The premise in SCO's case was that an industry standard operating system for industry standard hardware – capable of handling the kind of multi-tasking, multi-user workload that MS-DOS could not – would give customers a compelling offering that previously was thought only possible with considerably more expensive minicomputers. By early 1991, The New York Times was publishing a profile of SCO based around the notion that it might become "the next Microsoft".

=== Applications and SCO Office Portfolio ===
While SCO operating systems were often the basis of vertical market software offerings by others, SCO had long desired to create additional horizontal market software applications for its operating system product as part of further popularizing it. Thus SCO had provided some basic applications with Xenix, including database, graphics, a word processor, and a spreadsheet.

In 1988, these applications were bundled together as part of an offering known as SCO Office Portfolio, which serves as an integrated environment for office automation on Xenix, SCO Unix, and SCO Open Desktop. The portfolio primarily comprises SCO Lyrix, a word processor; SCO Professional, a spreadsheet; and SCO Integra, an SQL-based relational database. The first two were developed by SCO, while SCO Integra is based on an SQL engine from Coromandel Industries augmented by a 4GL called Accell from Unify Corporation.

Linking them together was the SCO Manager, which has a character-based but multi-windowed interface. It provides desktop tools such as mail, calendaring, and chat; an expandable menu system; and a clipboard mechanism for transmitting information between applications. The system administration interface for SCO Unix itself also adopted the Portfolio Manager interface.

Early 1990 also saw the release of Microsoft Word version 5.0 for Xenix and SCO Unix, which was also available as part of SCO Office Portfolio. It has functionality equivalent to Word for DOS, and was marketed to government agencies and other organizations running multiuser office systems. This was followed in early 1991 by Word 5.1 for SCO Unix, which has graphical user interface support. As part of adapting Word to Unix, SCO made various enhancements for multiuser support and workgroup-related features.

SCO had visions of selling its applications on platforms other than its own. In late 1988, SCO and Sun Microsystems announced that SCO Office Portfolio would be ported to Sun-3 workstations running SunOS. And in mid-1990, SCO made its Word for Unix available for AT&T 3B2 and AT&T 6386 systems.

One of the offerings in the SCO Office Portfolio was SCO FoxBase+, a version of FoxBase that is explicitly purposed as a look-alike to the popular dBase III database software for MS-DOS. And even SCO's advertisements had called SCO Professional a "workalike" of the popular Lotus 1-2-3 spreadsheet. This resulted in problems when, in July 1990, Lotus Development Corporation sued SCO for copyright infringement, as one of several such actions that Lotus took against its imitators and competitors. The suit was settled out of court a year later; in a victory for Lotus, SCO agreed to stop all sales and licensing of SCO Professional and instead recommend that customers use 1-2-3.

In the end, SCO had neither the market share nor the sales ability to compete on applications with the major players in that area such as Microsoft and Lotus. Accordingly, staffing level and expenses for application work were sharply reduced in 1991, and again in 1993–94. The final version of Microsoft Word for SCO Unix, for instance, was 5.1.1; it was eventually withdrawn as a product by SCO in 1996.

=== ACE and near insolvency ===
Besides Microsoft, venture capitalists owned about 20 percent of SCO by 1991, meaning that the Michelses owned a majority of the company, although by 1993 the Michelses' share was stated as being about one-third. These venture capital firms included Morgan Stanley, Accel Partners, Chancellor Capital, and Wolfensohn & Company.

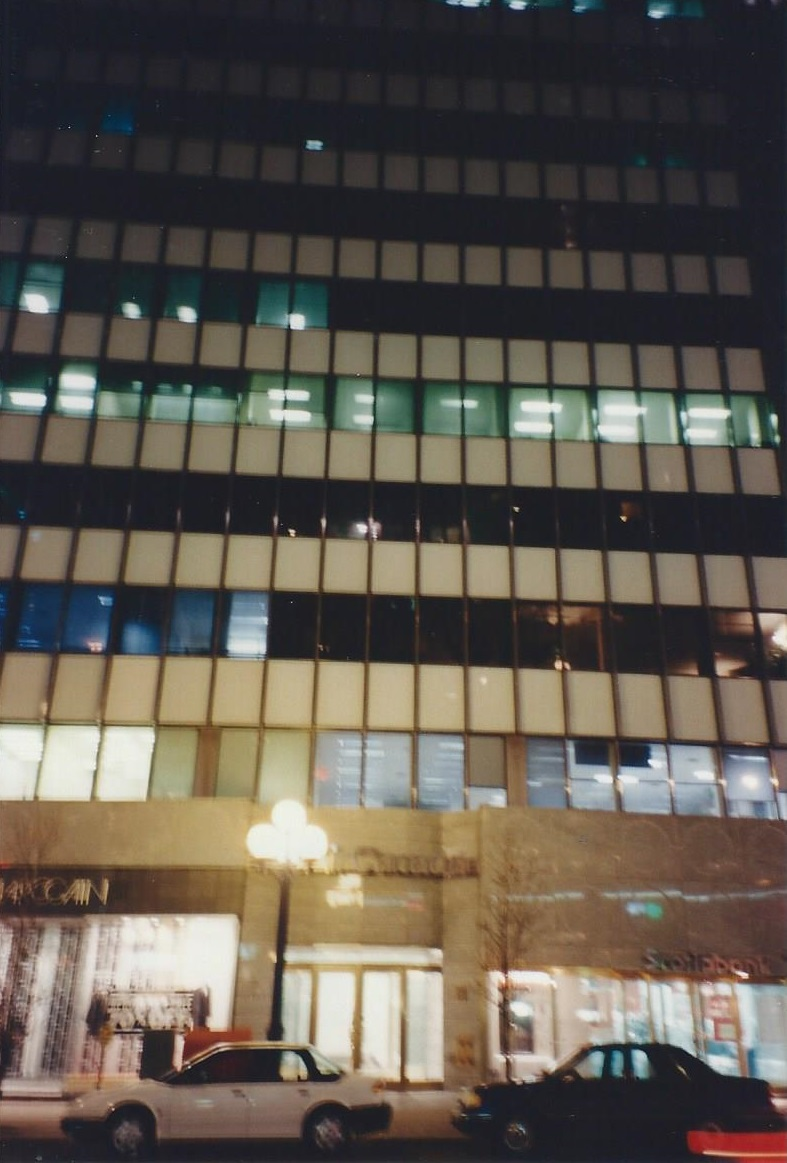
SCO's Toronto development office was housed in this building (here seen several years after the site was shut down).

During the late 1980s and early 1990s, analysts said that, given its revenue SCO should be more profitable than it was. Indeed, SCO had never been able to show profits on a consistent basis; through the end of fiscal 1991 SCO had accumulated a total loss of $31 million over its entire existence. SCO had high staffing levels, with for instance the $106 million revenue for 1990 going along with 1,300 employees, which was twice the level a typical software company of its era would have had. One analyst said that SCO "is run like a university, a family-run university, not a company." Commenting on the company's efforts to write applications for Unix themselves, another analyst said "It's a company that attacks in all directions." In part due to this kind of criticism, the Michelses said in late 1990 that they saw significant downsides to going public and preferred to remain private. One former employee recalled that Larry Michels "ran SCO like it was a downhill skier racing out of control. He liked to think the company was literally like that – the fastest guy was always a little bit out of control. SCO was always a little out of control."

The late 1980s saw considerable interest in RISC-based processor architectures in comparison to Intel's existing CISC-based approach, and there was particular interest in the R3000 and R4000 processors from MIPS Computer Systems. Major hardware vendors such as Digital Equipment Corporation were switching over to RISC-based systems.

In April 1991, the Advanced Computing Environment initiative was announced. There were a number of companies involved, but in term of the major players, it consisted of Compaq, Microsoft, MIPS Computer Systems, DEC and the Santa Cruz Operation. It had the goal of building the next generation commodity computing platform around the MIPS processor. Microsoft's role was to supply a version of OS/2 for the processor (this OS/2 version would become the basis of Windows NT). SCO's job was to supply the Unix operating system for the processor. The work consisted of taking DEC's OSF/1 variant of Unix as one starting point, SCO's Open Desktop as another, and adding in elements of DEC's previous Ultrix flavor, to produce a Unix for the ACE platform. SCO created a top-level business unit within the company to focus on the ACE work and the expected market resulting from it.

But almost from the beginning, the ACE consortium was challenged by the difficulty of large, powerful companies with disparate interests working together; one German executive from a non-member company called ACE an "eier-legende Wollmilchsau" (egg-laying woolen milk pig). By November 1991, SCO's work was reported as six months behind schedule. At the same time, indications were reported in trade media, the business press, and the general press that the ACE project as a whole was in trouble. In April 1992, a year after the start, the project fell apart; SCO publicly acknowledged that it had abandoned work on the Unix for MIPS and had withdrawn from the consortium, no longer confident that the project would succeed or was even necessary given improvements in CISC processor speed from Intel. Compaq withdrew as well, and MIPS Computer Systems was in the middle of being bought out. Only some of the heavy engineering expenditures that SCO had spent on ACE were recoverable; Larry Michels said, "We learned a lot out of ACE. We learned the hard way."

We knew how to code, we knew how to market and sell, and we knew how to party. We were growing like crazy and didn't know quite when to stop.

— Doug Michels in 2012, reflecting upon SCO's history.

As a whole during this period, SCO's expenses were too high and the company was undercapitalized. And by several accounts, during 1991 the company came close to becoming bankrupt. The year saw a large-scale reduction in staffing levels from that peak of 1,300 – with around 12 percent of the workforce being let go across two rounds of layoffs – together with a company-wide reorganization that involved new managers being brought in from other technology companies. Especially targeted for elimination were the projects to build applications for Unix.

Following these changes, SCO showed a profit during its fiscal 1992 and the first half of its fiscal 1993. In 1992, Software Magazine wrote that SCO had long been "the only major player in this market," but noted that Univel and SunSoft were both introducing Unix-on-Intel products. Both of these were from better-financed companies. But the sales of UnixWare 1.0 turned out to be modest, and SCO's share of the Unix-on-Intel market was around 65 percent in mid-1993. For 1993 overall, SCO sold around 185,000 copies of its Unix product, while Novell (which acquired Univel) sold around 35,000 of UnixWare and Sun's sales of Solaris-on-Intel were insignificant. PC Magazine, in a lengthy review the following year of different operating system choices for the Intel architecture, wrote that SCO had a dominant position in the Unix-on-Intel market. The magazine added that with its "Tyrannosaurus Rex"-like presence and more than 3,000 applications available, independent software vendors interested in Unix on PCs invariably made products that were SCO Unix-conformant.

=== Going public ===
By the summer of 1992, it was clear that SCO was intending to go public in the near future, and a number of investment bankers, brokers, and analysts attended that year's SCO Forum conference with that possibility in mind. Larry Michels now viewed becoming a public company as crucial, as it would give SCO greater access to investment capital and because it would make SCO a more credible vendor to large corporations. There was also a desire to let employees benefit from the stock options they held. At the same time, Michels had become prominent in the local business scene in Santa Cruz County, arguing that the area had to be more aggressive about fostering economic development. At one point he asked SCO employees to attend a public hearing in support of a controversial plan for an outlet mall in which he was an investor. He was also a sponsor of several charitable events and philanthropies in the Santa Cruz area.

On December 5, 1992, the San Jose Mercury News broke the story that three former executive secretaries at SCO had filed a lawsuit two days earlier against Larry Michels and SCO for sexual harassment. The suit, which named the women involved and was filed in Santa Cruz County Superior Court, stated that Michels had, on repeated occasions, propositioned or groped the women and had forced them into kissing him at work. In charging a sexually-hostile work environment, the women characterized Michels' behavior as "oppressive, demeaning, sexually belittling, intimidating, exploitive and abusive." When one of the women had complained about Michels to the human resources department, she said she was told "that's just Larry, being Larry," and that the onus was on her to come up with a proposal on how she should be treated and present it to Michels. One of the women had been fired, another had quit her job, and the third had been transferred to another position after filing a complaint with the California Department of Fair Employment and Housing.

When asked for his reaction by a reporter, Michels denied the allegations in the suit and said, "Did it say I raped anybody? Did it say I pinned anybody down?" In response to the accusations hugging and kissing the women against their will at work, Michels said, "How serious a crime is that?" And asked if he regretted any of his actions, he said "I certainly regret that I hired those three girls." On December 15, a fourth-named former executive secretary joined the lawsuit, saying among other allegations that Michels had taken her to a remote wooded property he owned and tried to force himself on her and that she ran away for fear of being raped. Public attention to sexual harassment had increased following the previous year's Clarence Thomas-Anita Hill hearings, and complaints had been filed with the California Department of Fair Employment and Housing against other high-level male executives at SCO as well. On December 16 the board of directors of SCO announced that it had appointment one of its members, Jim Harris, to investigate the situation at SCO and that the board was "extremely distressed by the recent allegations made against the company and its president."

On December 21, 1992, less than three weeks after initial lawsuit was filed, Larry Michels resigned as chief executive of SCO. Harris became interim president of the company. The rapid sequence of events triggered what the Santa Cruz Sentinel termed a period of "internal turmoil and depression" within the organization.

A month later, Lars Turndal took over as president and chief executive officer of SCO. Turndal, originally from Sweden, had overseen the large growth in SCO's European operation over the preceding six years. Harris became chairman of the board, while Doug Michels remained executive vice president and also became chief technical officer. Programs begun by Harris, and continued by Turndal, sought to introduce to the company externally provided classes in cultural sensitivity and to establish an internal diversity council.

In early April 1993, the sexual harassment suit was settled out of court, with the four women being awarded a total of $1.25 million. At the same time, SCO filed the necessary papers with the United States Securities and Exchange Commission to go public. Prosecutors in Santa Cruz County considered whether criminal charges should be filed against Larry Michels but after a two-month investigation decided not to. Michels received a $354,000 "golden handshake" from SCO, which brought some criticism from employment rights' advocates. (Michels never returned to the company, although he kept in touch with what was going on via his son, and died of a stroke in 1999.)

The initial public offering for The Santa Cruz Operation, Inc. took place on May 27, 1993. The stock traded on NASDAQ under the symbol SCOC. The stock's offering price was 12 1/2 and it closed at 12 3/8, meaning that it did not have the first-day jump that "hot" IPOs are expected to show.

The firm's initial stretch as a public company was difficult. Two important board members, Harris and Microsoft's Gaudette, died during 1993, with Turndal succeeding Harris as chairman. By year's end the stock price was around 6 1/8, or half what it had started at.

The transitions of this period marked the change in SCO from being an entrepreneur-driven company to one driven by the need to behave in a more business-like manner and show steady profits. Turndal further jettisoned unprofitable applications and focused on SCO's core Unix business as well as middleware additions to strengthen the platform. In December 1994, Turndal was made chair of the board as well as CEO, while Alok Mohan was elevated to president and chief operating officer.

With its first release in mid-1993, Microsoft's server operating system Windows NT became a looming threat to the Unix-on-Intel market. SCO had even more commercial competitors in the Unix-on-Intel space, including NCR, IBM, Sequent, SunSoft's Solaris, and Novell's UnixWare, and each of these is based on SVR4. SCO was the only Unix-on-Intel vendor basing their product on SVR3.2. But there were many applications available for OpenServer, in part the result of SCO having forged many partnerships with other computer companies. Over half of all SCO sales were through VARs, who typically used SCO as the basis for an end-user application and then bundled the hardware, operating system, and application as a turnkey solution.

By the mid-1990s, SCO Unix in all its product releases had an installed base of a million systems sold. SCO OpenServer had a foothold in the corporate world as well; the 1997 edition of the book UNIX Unleashed wrote that "It is very popular among corporate internets/intranets and has been for many years." The book added that "Its technical support cannot be matched, which is why many corporations choose this commercial OS as their server OS of choice."

=== PizzaNet, SCO Global Access, first Internet concert ===
SCO also recognized the importance of the Internet. In August 1994, SCO and Pizza Hut announced PizzaNet, a pilot program in the Santa Cruz area that allowed consumers to use their own computer to order pizza delivery from a local Pizza Hut restaurant, with connection being made over the Internet to a central Pizza Hut server in Wichita, Kansas. The PizzaNet application software was developed by SCO's Professional Services group.

PizzaNet was based on the first commercially licensed and bundled Internet operating system, SCO Global Access. SCO was the first commercial Unix system supplier to license the powerful NCSA Mosaic hypertext browser and NCSA HTTPd, and the first to ship these technologies from the National Center for Supercomputing Applications at the University of Illinois Urbana-Champaign bundled with an operating system for commercial use.

On August 23, 1994, SCO broadcast a live music concert from the UC Santa Cruz's Cowell Courtyard. This event, part of SCO Forum 1994, is said to be the first time a scheduled live music concert was broadcast over the Internet; it was sent over both the Mbone and the emerging World Wide Web. The band was Deth Specula, a group composed of SCO employees. Their first song parodied Grand Funk Railroad's "We're an American Band". Deth Specula sang "We Are an Internet Band" with lyrics like:

We're comin' to your town
To bring your network down
We are an Internet band.

=== Everest ===
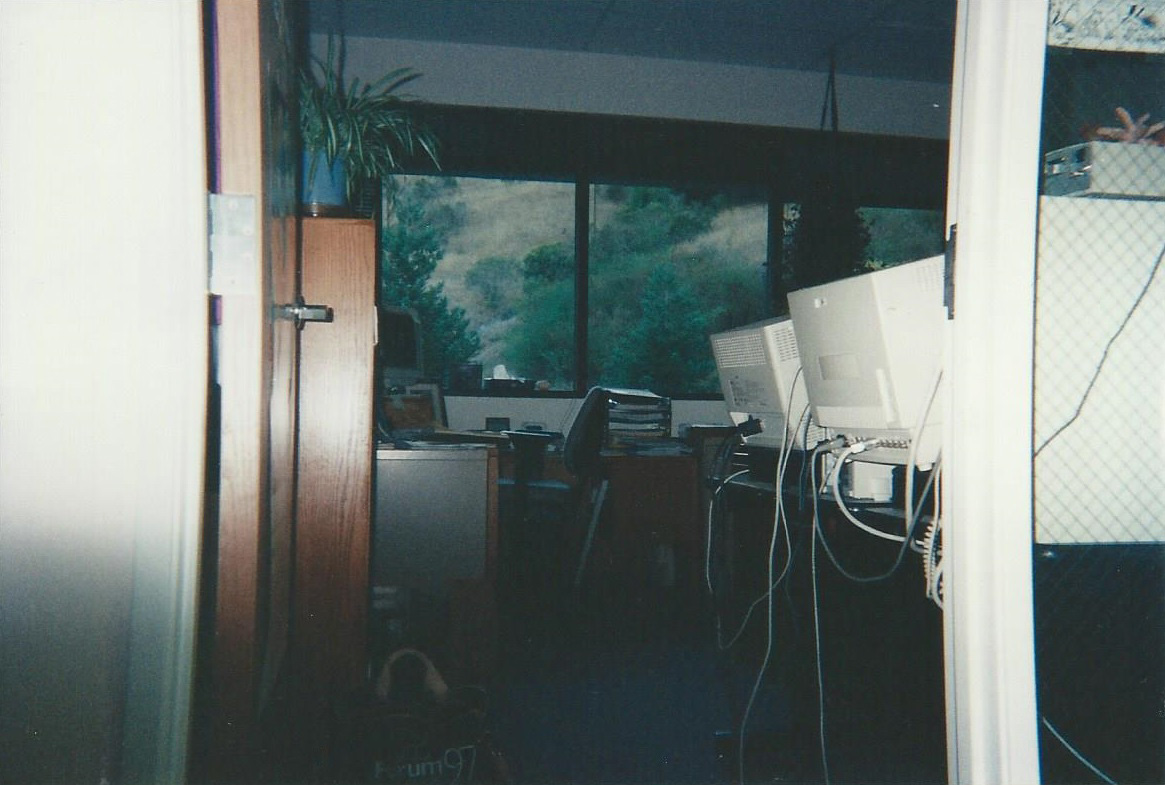
Interior of an office in the main buildings on Encinal Street in Santa Cruz, with the hills of the Pogonip area outside the window

The next big product release from the company was code-named "Everest". It resulted from three years of labor at SCO's Santa Cruz, Watford, and Toronto development sites, an effort that amounted to $50 million in research and development costs. The general thrust of the work was towards supporting the requirements of business-critical servers. It included adding support for memory-mapped files, the journaling HTFS filesystem with mirroring and striping support, disk compression, RAID levels 0, 1, and 5, POSIX.1b real-time scheduling and semaphores, the Advanced Power Management interface, and SVID 3–level conformance. Everest expanded MP support from 8 to 32 processors. Everest has hardware support for 900 different physical machines, of which 60 were SMP systems, and for some 2,000 peripheral devices.

Another major new feature of Everest is the SCOadmin system administration tool, with both graphical and command-line interfaces, and software upgrades that can be run either locally or remotely. The existence of an administration framework and GUI was considered by InfoWorld writer Jason Pontin to be important in competing with the user-friendly qualities of Windows NT.

Everest was released as SCO OpenServer Release 5. The release was celebrated with a corporate event at the Hudson Theatre in New York City on May 9, 1995. The location was chosen in part to give the product an East Coast corporate veneer rather than a West Coast laid-back one. As part of the release publicity, SCO emphasized they had settled on competing in the server market and had halted any attempt to compete with Windows in the desktop client market.

Industry analysts were generally impressed with OpenServer. Testers of beta releases of the product, including Taco Bell which was deploying OpenServer to each of its 4,000 stores, were impressed by its reliability.

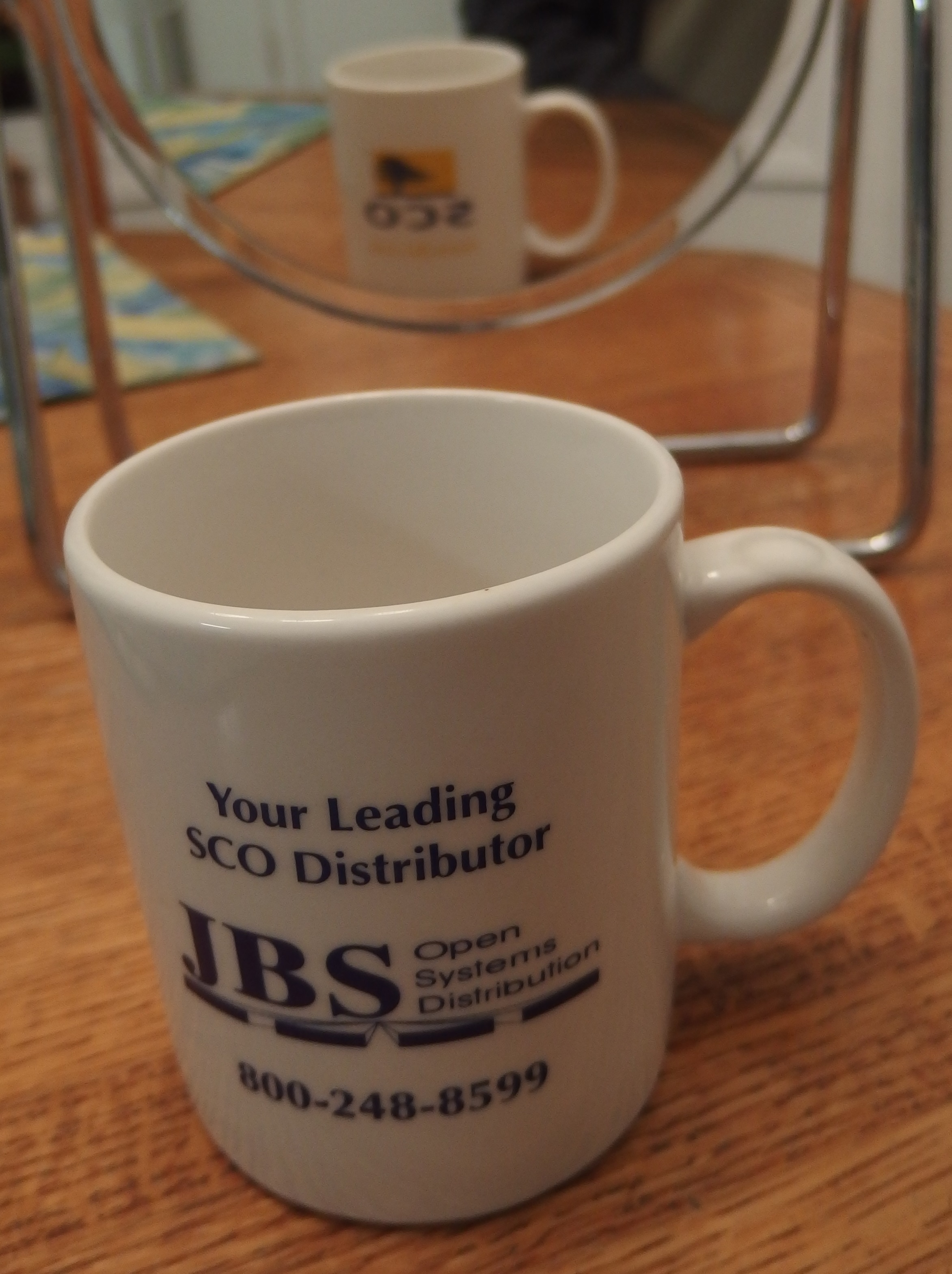
Distributors, resellers and the like: 'The channel' was vital to SCO's success.

Although parts of the Unix kernel were rewritten during the Everest project, it is still fundamentally the nearly ten-year-old System V Release 3.2 kernel and as such has some limitations, such as not being multithreaded. This lack of native threads support would prove a challenge in years to come when certain kinds of modern system software needed to run on the platform. OpenServer 5 was compatible with around 8,000 business applications, and it was partly a desire to maintain compatibility with existing applications that prevented SCO from making more drastic changes to the operating system. Overall on a technical evaluation, PC Magazine found OpenServer 5 to be good but not quite as good as Novell's UnixWare 2 product. One Unix OEM told PC Week that OpenServer 5 was "a good product, but it's not a revolutionary product; it's an evolutionary product. It doesn't quite do the enterprise stuff people are looking for."

One project which sought to improve OpenServer's technology base was code-named "MK2". Its origins date to 1992 with an agreement between SCO and the French company Chorus Systèmes SA for cooperative work on the Chorus microkernel technology in the context of combining OpenServer with a microkernel for use in real-time processing environments in telecommunications and other areas. The first result of this, a dual-functionality product called Chorus/Fusion for SCO Open Systems Software, was released in 1994. By 1995, SCO had set up a business unit for the MK2 venture and was spending considerable amounts of engineering resources on what was now a reimplementation of OpenServer to run on top of the Chorus microkernel, in what was going to be called the SCO Telecommunications OS Platform. A primary customer for this work was the Private Communications Systems unit within Siemens. Later in 1995 the MK2 project had to adjust for SCO's acquisition of UnixWare technology from Novell, and the goal became to run merged OpenServer/UnixWare code on top of Chorus. However, by early 1997, relations had broken down between SCO, Chorus, and the customer, and the MK2 project was scrapped without having achieved fruition.

Through several changes of corporate ownership, SCO OpenServer 5 would remain a supported product into the 2020s.

On July 1, 1995, Lars Turndal retired and Alok Mohan became the company's CEO. Mohan's background was in corporate finance and strategic planning with AT&T Global Information Solutions. The equities market immediately reflected changes in SCO financial statements: When customers spent more time evaluating OpenServer 5 rather than buying it during the first quarter it was available, SCO missed its forecasted earnings and SCO stock lost a quarter of its value.

=== Client Integration Division ===
In February 1993, SCO acquired IXI Limited, a software company in Cambridge, UK, best known for its X.desktop product, which formed the graphical basis of Open Desktop. In December 1994, SCO bought Visionware, of Leeds, UK, developers of XVision. The roles of the two companies were different but complementary, as one former SCO UK employee has succinctly summarised: "IXI specialised in software that ran on Unix and made Unix easier to use. ... Visionware specialised in software that ran on Windows that made Unix easier to use."

In 1995, SCO combined the two development teams to form the IXI Visionware, Ltd. subsidiary. Later in 1995, the merged business unit was subsumed more fully into its parent and became the Client Integration Division of SCO.

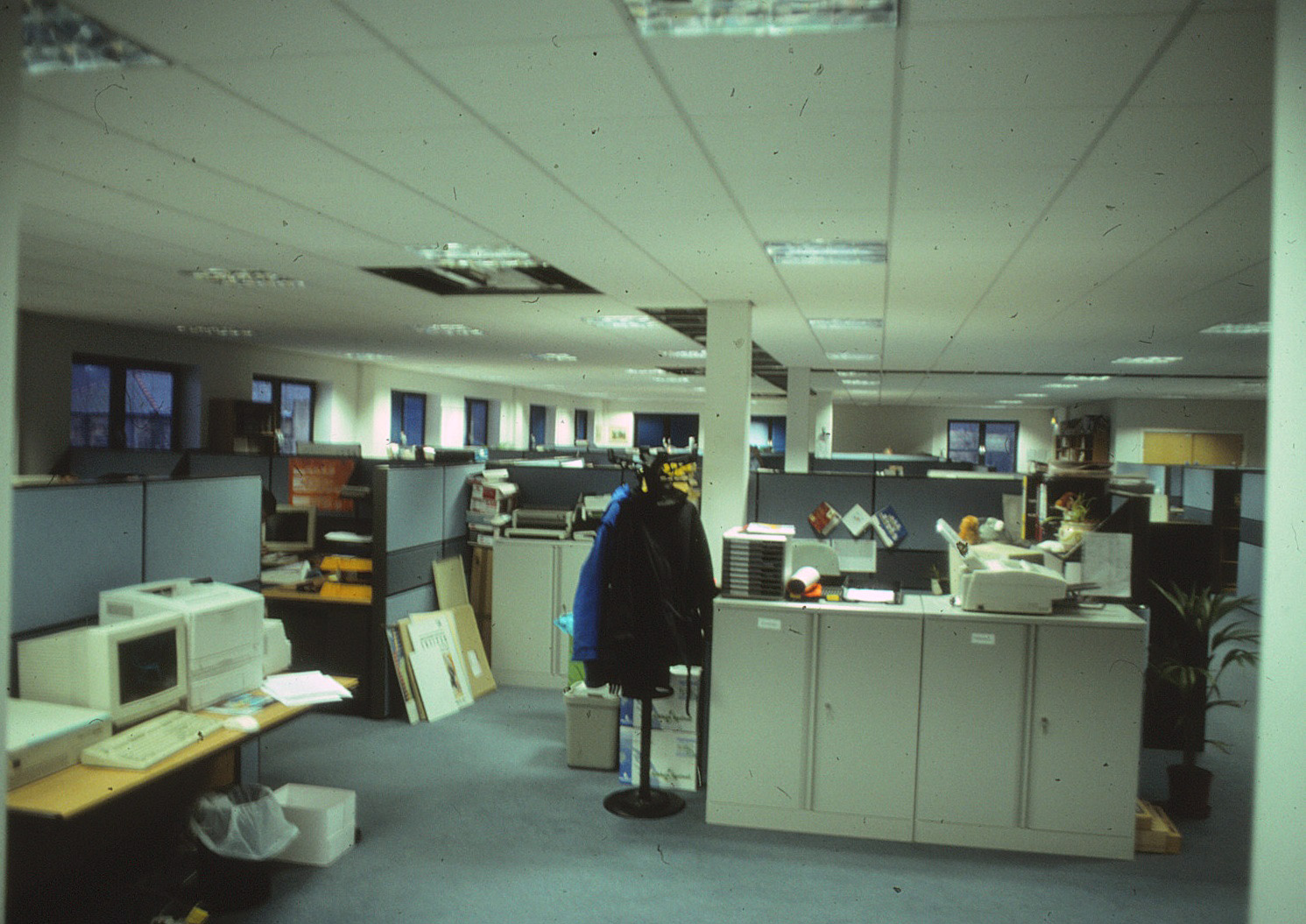
Main floor of the SCO Leeds office, 1997

These acquisitions were part of SCO acknowledging that it did not want to compete with Microsoft on the desktop, but rather wanted to put forward a Windows-friendly product strategy. It also fit SCO's idea of the client–server model of computing, where SCO would offer connectivity and middleware components to support Windows clients talking to SCO servers.

In May 1997, the Client Integration Division released the Vision97 family of products: XVision Eclipse (a PC X server), VisionFS (an SMB server for UNIX), TermVision (a terminal emulator for Microsoft Windows), SuperVision (centralised management of users from Windows), and SQL-Retriever (ODBC- and JDBC-compliant database connectivity software). The VisionFS product was developed from scratch by the Cambridge development team; the other products were developed by the Leeds development team and were mostly new versions of the existing Visionware products. A later release of the suite is branded as Vision2K.

The Client Integration Division was relatively independent of the rest of SCO, for reasons both technical and organizational. It ported its code to all major Unix platforms, including those of SCO's competitors. It operated its own web site for some time. The SCO Unix channel-based sales model did not work well for the Vision products, and the client division had its own sales force. This was illustrated by SCO having two different subsidiaries in Japan: Nihon SCO, which dealt with the operating system products and services, and SCO K.K., a joint venture which handled the Vision product line.

== Later history ==
=== The Novell–SCO–HP deal of 1995 ===
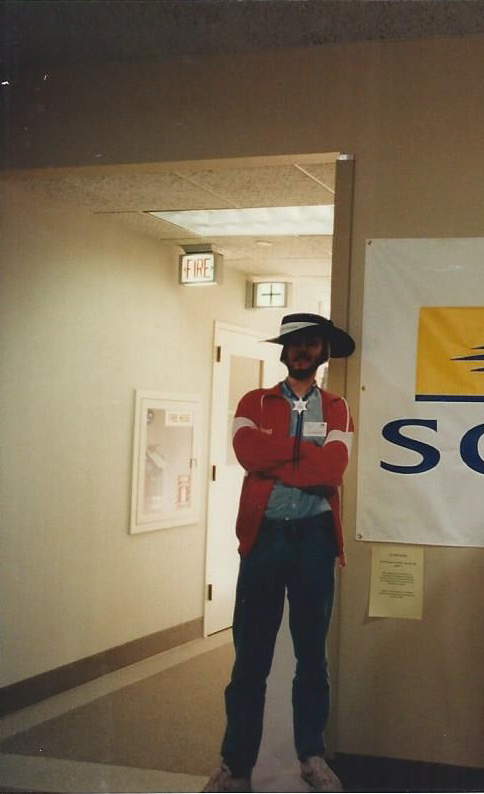
Corporate history in a joke: Bjarne Stroustrup, the creator of C++, worked for AT&T and then USL, who made a promotional cardboard cutout figure of himself. Novell and then SCO inherited the cutout. For some time after the Novell–SCO–HP deal closed, all three companies were sharing the same office space in Florham Park, New Jersey. In order to demark which corridors were SCO's, the Stroustrup cutout was put up with a hat, a bolo tie-with-badge, and a SCO business card saying "SCOland Sheriff".

Novell's 1993 acquisition of Unix System Laboratories had never really worked out, and by late summer 1995 Novell was looking for a way out of the Unix business. On September 20, 1995, Novell announced the sale of that business to SCO, coincident with a licensing arrangement with Hewlett-Packard. As part of the deal, SCO said that it would merge the SVR4.2-based UnixWare with the SVR3.2-based OpenServer, creating a new merged product code-named "Gemini". Gemini would then be sold through SCO's channel and reseller operation. SCO and HP also said that they would co-develop a next-generation, 64-bit version of Unix for use with "Merced", the code name for HP and Intel's upcoming 64-bit architecture. Some 400 Novell software engineers had been working on UnixWare, mostly in an office in Florham Park, New Jersey; almost all of these engineers joined either SCO or HP (about a year later, the SCO part relocated to offices in Murray Hill, New Jersey). The part of the deal between Novell and SCO closed on December 6, 1995.

As Doug Michels later reflected in 2006, SCO seized on the idea of buying the Unix business from Novell for three reasons: "for one, we got all the talent from Bell Labs that had created Unix; two, we got the moral authority around Unix; and three, we got rid of all the crazy historical licensing problems" dating from Unix's origins within AT&T. In order to reduce the price to SCO, part of the deal was that SCO agreed to pay a royalty stream back to Novell of UnixWare sales.

By December 1995, there were already some indications that the three-way arrangement was not working out as had been initially advertised. The computer industry was not sure that SCO could handle being the primary Unix shepherd. The HP project, code-named "White Box", focused on making a hybrid environment out of the SRV4.2-based Gemini and the SVR3.2-based HP-UX, but that effort faced major technical hurdles.

"White Box" became the 3DA effort, the purpose of which was to unify OpenServer, UnixWare, and HP-UX in some way to produce a resulting product would then become the de facto Unix standard for both existing IA-32 systems and the upcoming IA-64. The effort was motivated in part by threat of Windows NT threat taking advantage of splits among Unix providers when 64-bit systems arrived in common use. By August 1996, HP and SCO were delivering application programming interface (API) specifications to various OEMs and ISVs, as well as doing a best-of-breed technology analysis to determine whether Gemini or HP-UX would be the going-forward source base for a given component. Both companies were also doing porting work to Merced using the early-version compilers available.

The effort was still in theory going in early 1997, when HP and SCO were to publish the "Lodi" set of common programming interfaces for a 64-bit Unix incorporating elements of OpenServer, UnixWare, and HP-UX. But little progress had been made on actual implementation, with sources for only a few components having been exchanged by the two companies. The collaboration failed for both business reasons – HP and SCO had differing perceptions of the marketplace – and technical ones – an inability to produce a common binary Unix-for-Intel product that could run existing applications from both companies' user bases. Primary among the technical obstacles were endianness considerations.

As an InformationWeek story later wrote, the three-way deal had been a "complicated plan" that was "confusing from the start". The terms of the deal between Novell and SCO were uncertain enough that an amendment to the agreement had to be signed in October 1996. (Even that was not clear enough to preclude an extended legal battle between Novell and The SCO Group during SCO–Linux disputes of the 2000s, a battle that The SCO Group eventually lost.)

=== "Gemini" and the UDK ===
Meanwhile, SCO focused on "Gemini", the task of combining the OpenServer and UnixWare product lines on 32-bit systems. The fundamental idea behind the Gemini was that SCO could merge OpenServer 5 and UnixWare 2 in a way that would satisfy the requirements of both small businesses and large enterprises and thus keep the existing customer base that SCO had with OpenServer while entering the enterprise space with UnixWare.

One consequence of the UnixWare acquisition was that the New Jersey office of Novell had a languages and development tools group with more advanced technology than what SCO Canada had been working with, including a C++ compiler based upon the Edison Design Group front-end, and that made the SCO Canada engineering staff largely redundant once the Novell deal was closed. As a result, the Toronto office was shut down in early 1996.

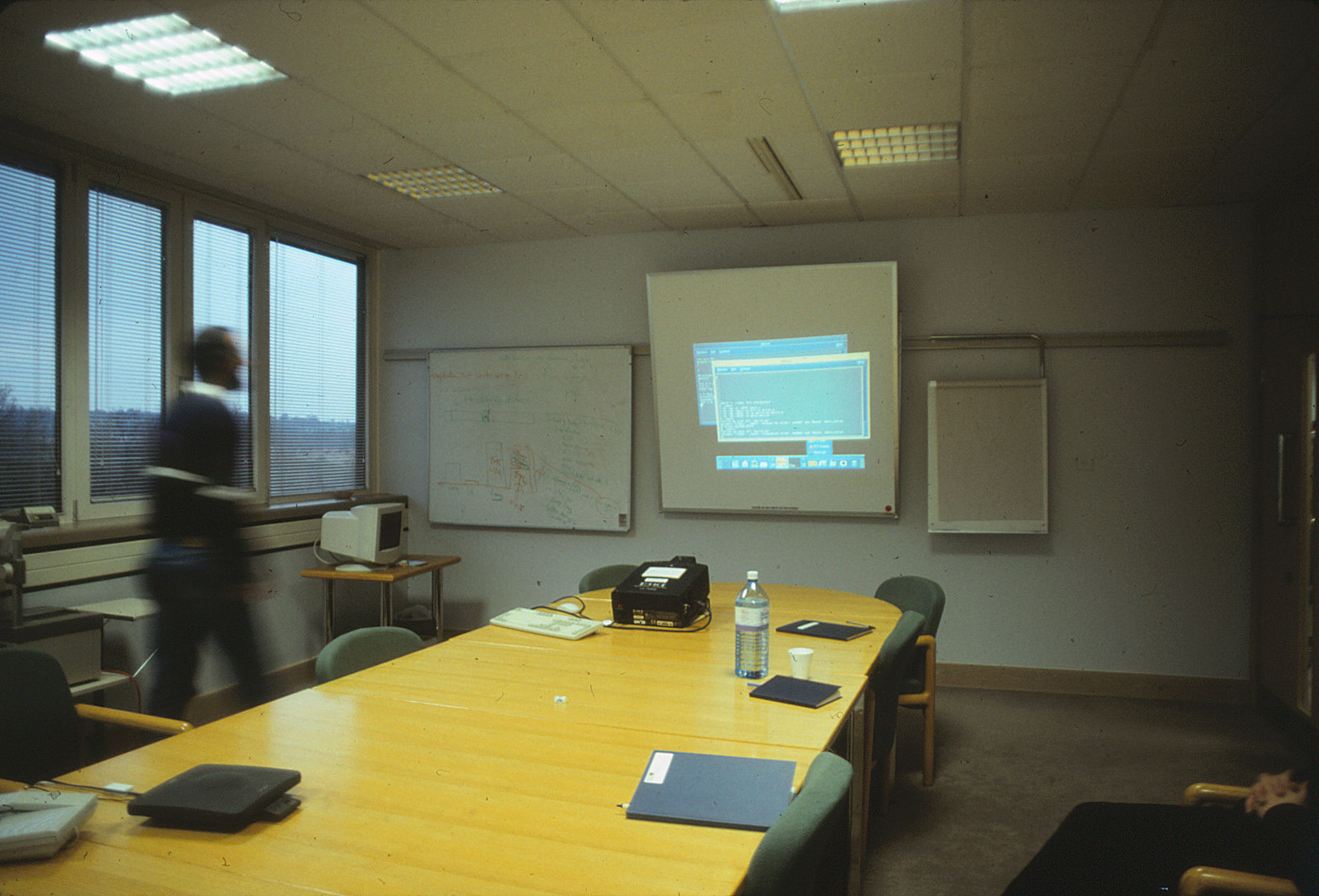
A meeting room in the SCO's Watford, England, office in 1997, where a UDK-related training session for support and escalation staff was being given by New Jersey-based staff; portions of a UnixWare desktop are being projected.

What the New Jersey group produced was the Universal Development Kit (UDK), which was a key element in the question of how to help OpenServer users to make the move to Gemini. With the UDK, a single build of a single version of an application's source code could produce binaries that would run unaltered on all three of SCO's platforms: UnixWare 2, OpenServer 5, and the upcoming Gemini. The UDK featured more modern C and C++ compilers and other tools compared to what OpenServer had, and included platform-specific optimizations for things such as C++ exception handling. The hope was that existing OpenServer developers would switch to using the UDK and thereby get an easy path towards migrating to Gemini.

Support for the new Java programming language and related Java technologies was also emphasized as a key part of the UDK and the operating system products themselves. Over the next several years, SCO would add engineering efforts towards making Java an effective vehicle for customers to use on SCO platforms, including a mapping of Java threads onto UnixWare light-weight processes, recognition of Java class files as first-class Unix executables, as well as adapting a just-in-time compiler to the original Sun Java virtual machine. Another announced SCO effort related to Java was PerkUp, an infrastructure built on the Java classloader facility that was billed as an additional service for UnixWare 7 that would reduce the total memory and throughput needs when multiple Java server applications were running on a system (however, PerkUp never emerged as a product, and the patent for it ended up with Apple, Inc. before expiring).

Initially, SCO had made a strong push for Gemini among the SCO user base; the August 1996 instance of the annual SCO Forum conference dedicated an extra two days to a series of "Gemini Fast-Track" sessions. But by a year later, SCO had decided it would not push the migration that quickly, although it still expected that within two or three years all users would migrate. One SCO executive said, "We mustn't disenfranchise the OpenServer path ... those guys [SCO resellers] are our lifeblood" and recalled that a few years earlier, SCO resellers had continued to sell Xenix-based systems even after SCO had stopped development work on Xenix.

When released as a product, Gemini was called UnixWare 7; the "7" was picked to reflect the summed merge of OpenServer 5 and UnixWare 2. SCO referred to UnixWare 7 as being based on an SVR5 kernel, indicating a significant jump over the existing SVR4.2, although the SVR5 designation was not picked up by the Unix world at large. UnixWare 7 was announced in March 1998 at an event in New York.

SCO committed itself to still maintaining and improving the OpenServer product for a couple of years, but made clear that it would never be expanded to 64-bit architectures. Thus at that point, OpenServer users would have to migrate.

=== "Big E" and DCAP ===
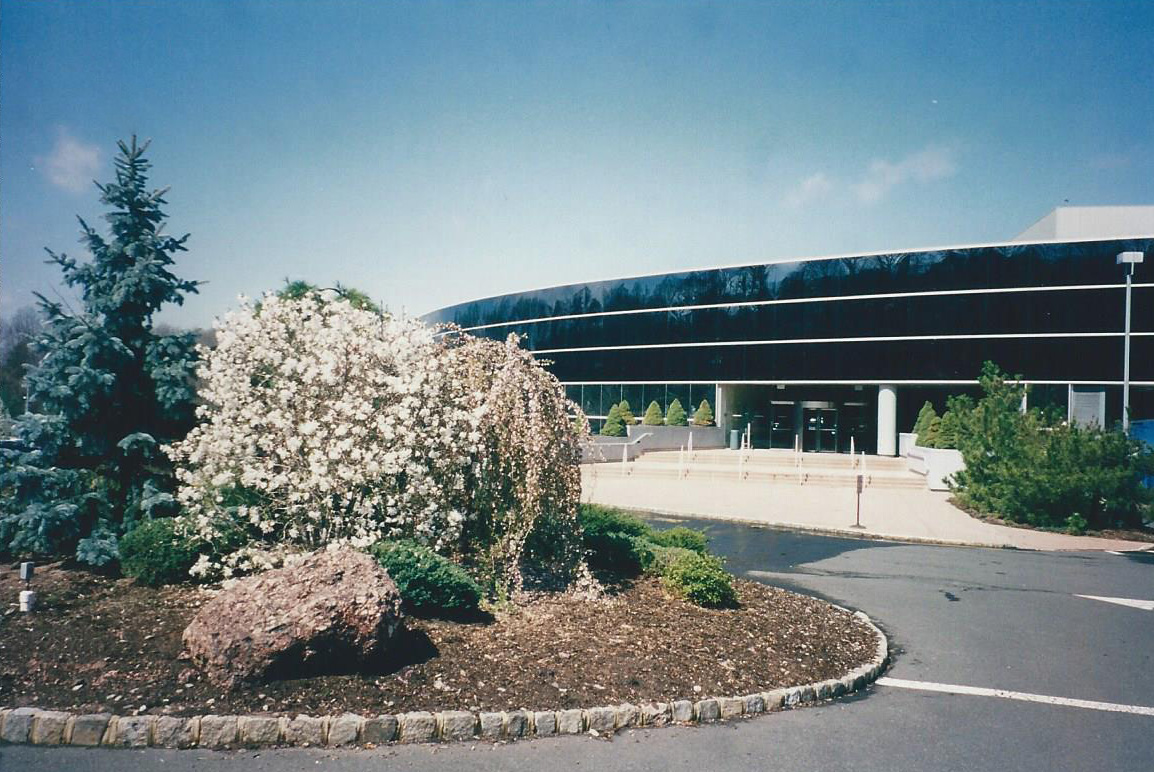
Much of the DCAP work was done here in 1998 at the SCO offices in Murray Hill, New Jersey.

SCO management was intent on selling UnixWare through OEM deals with hardware manufacturers aiming at the enterprise market, and towards this end in 1996 they announced the "Big E" initiative that would standardize UnixWare as the operating system on these systems and that would attract independent software vendors to make their products available on such systems. Hardware vendors already supporting UnixWare 7 included IBM, HP, Compaq, and Tandem, despite some of them offering their own Unix flavors on their high-end RISC systems. In particular, SCO had deals with IBM to sell UnixWare on the IBM Netfinity system.

In February 1998, SCO announced the creation of the Data Center Acceleration Program (DCAP), which sought to add features related to reliability, availability, and scalability to UnixWare 7 in order to make it fully suitable for high-end, Intel-based systems deployed in data centers. The funding for DCAP came from Intel and from four hardware OEM providers of Intel-based servers: Compaq, Data General, ICL, and Unisys. The features to be added to UnixWare 7 included six-way clustering and support for 16-way ccNUMA servers. As one analyst for International Data Group said, "UnixWare is moving upmarket." The program was also intended to help SCO fund development of UnixWare for the Merced architecture and give the four hardware vendors access to the resulting 64-bit OEM UnixWare without requiring further porting to each vendor's specific hardware.

A year later, at the CeBIT show in March 1999, SCO announced the release of UnixWare 7, Data Center Edition, as the product of the DCAP effort. In addition to the sponsoring companies, IBM and Sequent both said they would offer the data center edition on their servers. In terms of high availability figures, the data center edition promised 99.99% availability ("four nines") at the time of release, with 99.995% ("four and a half nines") to arrive by 2000. Another avenue towards capturing space in the enterprise was work that SCO did in conjunction with Compaq and Tandem towards the 1998 release of UnixWare NonStop Clusters.

The data center release came out at the same time as UnixWare 7.1 release, which offers six different edition bundles in all. A review in InfoWorld said that "UnixWare 7 is the sturdiest and most feature-rich Unix ever ported to Intel processors" and added that, especially with the addition of the webtop interface, the 7.1 release was equal in polish to Windows NT. UnixWare 7.1 started seeing some strong sales.

Through several changes of corporate ownership, UnixWare 7 would remain a supported product into the 2020s.

Another multi-company initiative that SCO led was the Uniform Driver Interface project (UDI), which sought to establish an OS-neutral and platform-neutral portable interface for writing device drivers. The UDI project had the backing of Intel, HP, IBM, Compaq, Sun, and others, as well as the involvement of independent hardware vendors such as Adaptec. UDI details were heavily discussed at the 1999 edition of SCO Forum; and UDI materialized in SCO operating systems with later UnixWare 7 and OpenServer 5 releases.

=== Tarantella product ===
October 1997 saw the first release of a new product from the Client Integration Division. Tarantella is an application brokering platform that sits between back-end applications running on various platforms and Java-enabled web browser clients. An initial limitation was that it supported applications running on Unix but needed third-party software in order to handle mainframe or Windows applications. One selling point of Tarantella is that users could begin working on an application on one client, have to stop working for whatever reason, and then resume working from that point on from another client. A review in InfoWorld viewed Tarantella was promising but needing more work.

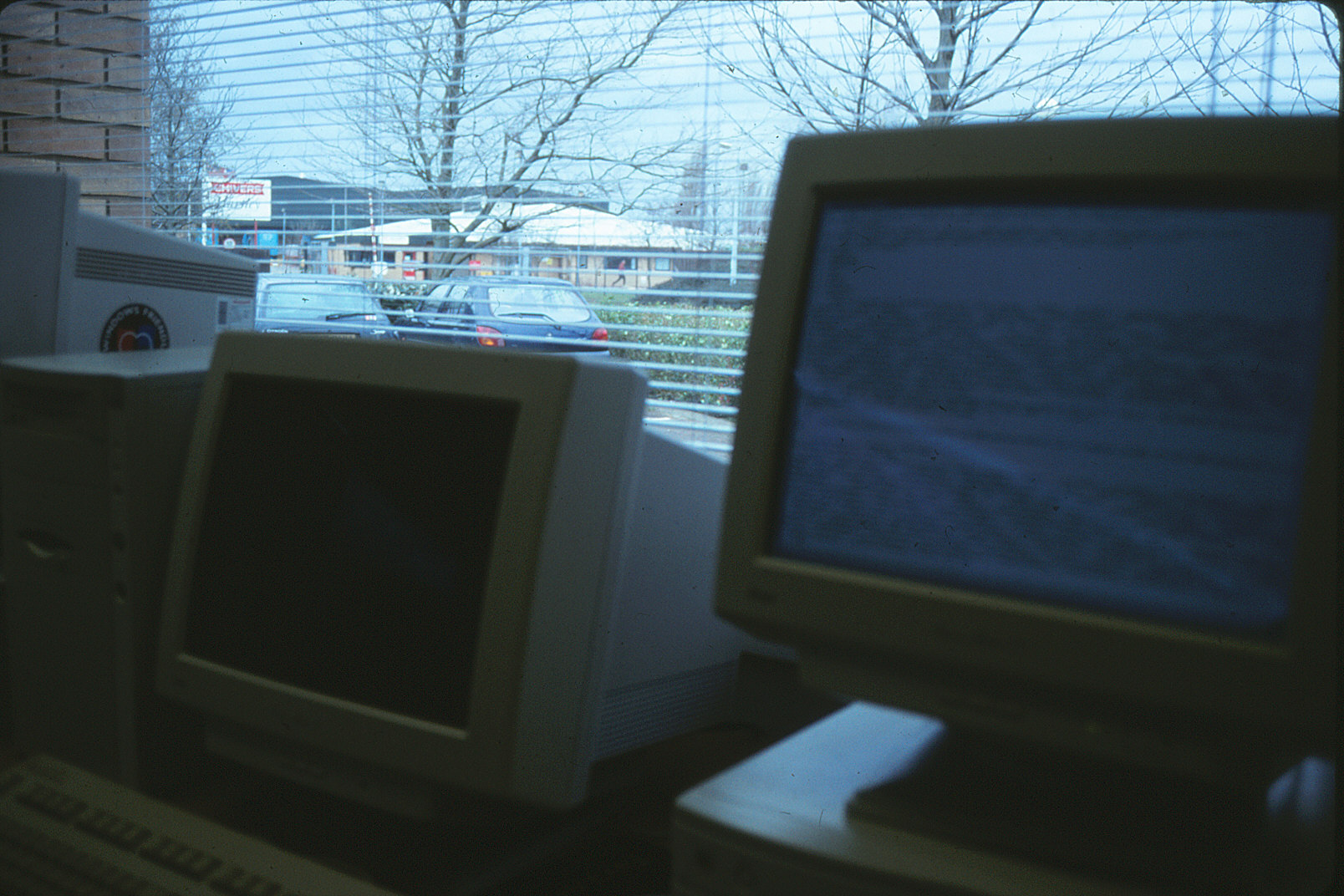
View out of the SCO Cambridge office, 1999

Later version 1.x releases support more application types, such as AS/400 and IBM mainframe applications. More client types were added as well, including native clients to remove the dependency on Java support. The product also added scalability and security features to better support larger enterprises and secure application access over the Internet.

A rebranding to Tarantella Enterprise II took place in late 1999. This release added support for Windows applications via native support for Microsoft's Remote Desktop Protocol. At that point, the primary competitor to Tarantella became the MetaFrame product from Citrix Systems. While Citrix was the dominant player in this space, it did not yet support Unix applications, whereas Tarantella does.

Significant revenue from Tarantella did not happen during the 1990s, as it had a long sales cycle due to lengthy customer evaluations. SCO then sought to market Tarantella as a platform for application service providers to use and as a way that companies could host and outsource applications. As part of this, SCO sought to use Tarantella as a way of promoting itself as a new dot com company as opposed to its twenty-year history as an operating system provider.

SCO were pioneers in the notion of a web desktop, or webtop. This was also central to the idea of how Tarantella presents applications to a user. This was integrated with Tarantella to provide a UnixWare 7 webtop in 1999 which organizes access to UnixWare and its applications via any Java-enabled web browser. To some industry reviewers, the OS webtop was a compelling feature.

=== Customers and financial state ===
Between 1996 and 1997, SCO's share of the Unix systems sold rose from 36 percent to 40 percent. By 1998, the figure was over 40 percent. And in 1998, shipments of SCO Unix systems grew by 58 percent over 1997, a greater increase than for any other server-oriented flavor of Unix. The Unix market as a whole was considered strong, despite fears of the increasing power of Windows NT. And by 1998, SCO had 85 percent of the Unix-on-Intel market. At the end of the 1990s, SCO Unix systems had around 15,000 value-added resellers (VARs) and an infrastructure presence of some kind in 80 countries around the world. SCO also had a strong business in replicated sites, meaning retail companies where there was a SCO system in each store of a chain; such customers included fast food outlets such as McDonald's, Pizza Hut, and Taco Bell; pharmacy chains such as CVS Pharmacy and Walgreens; and other chains such as Kmart and Radio Shack. Other well-known companies who were SCO customers included Northwest Airlines, as well as Goodyear Tire & Rubber, Nasdaq, Inc., and Lucent Technologies. SCO was named to PC Magazine's "100 Most Influential Companies" list in both 1997 and 1998.

View source data.
SCO profit/loss by year (as a public company, in millions of dollars)

The company did not have good financial results during this time. By 1997, there were few independent operating system vendors left in the industry other than SCO. Being a software-only company whose revenue was only around the $200 million mark left SCO with marginal resources to compete with Unixes from the big RISC vendors like Digital, HP, and Sun. Engineering costs were high, as UnixWare 7 and Tarantella each resulted from two years of research and development activity. During 1997 there were some reductions in staff and closing of regional offices.

In April 1998, Doug Michels was named as president and CEO of the company, with Alok Mohan becoming chairman of the board. Michels said that he never aimed to become CEO, preferring to remain more technology-focused, but that he had always had a lot of visibility into the CEO role and was "obviously very emotionally and intellectually attached to the company" and its stakeholders.

One of Michels' first actions was to oversee a switch to electronic software licensing for SCO's products. The third quarter of fiscal 1997 had included a $23 million charge for reduction in channel inventory, and Michels said he was determined to eliminate issues related to the size of physical inventory. He stated that, "SCO believes electronic licensing and distribution of products will be a standard for the industry." The channel inventory was emptied by July 1998 and the new electronic licensing was in effect the following month for a new point release of OpenServer 5, the product that was still accounting for some 80 percent of SCO's Unix revenues.

=== "Monterey" ===
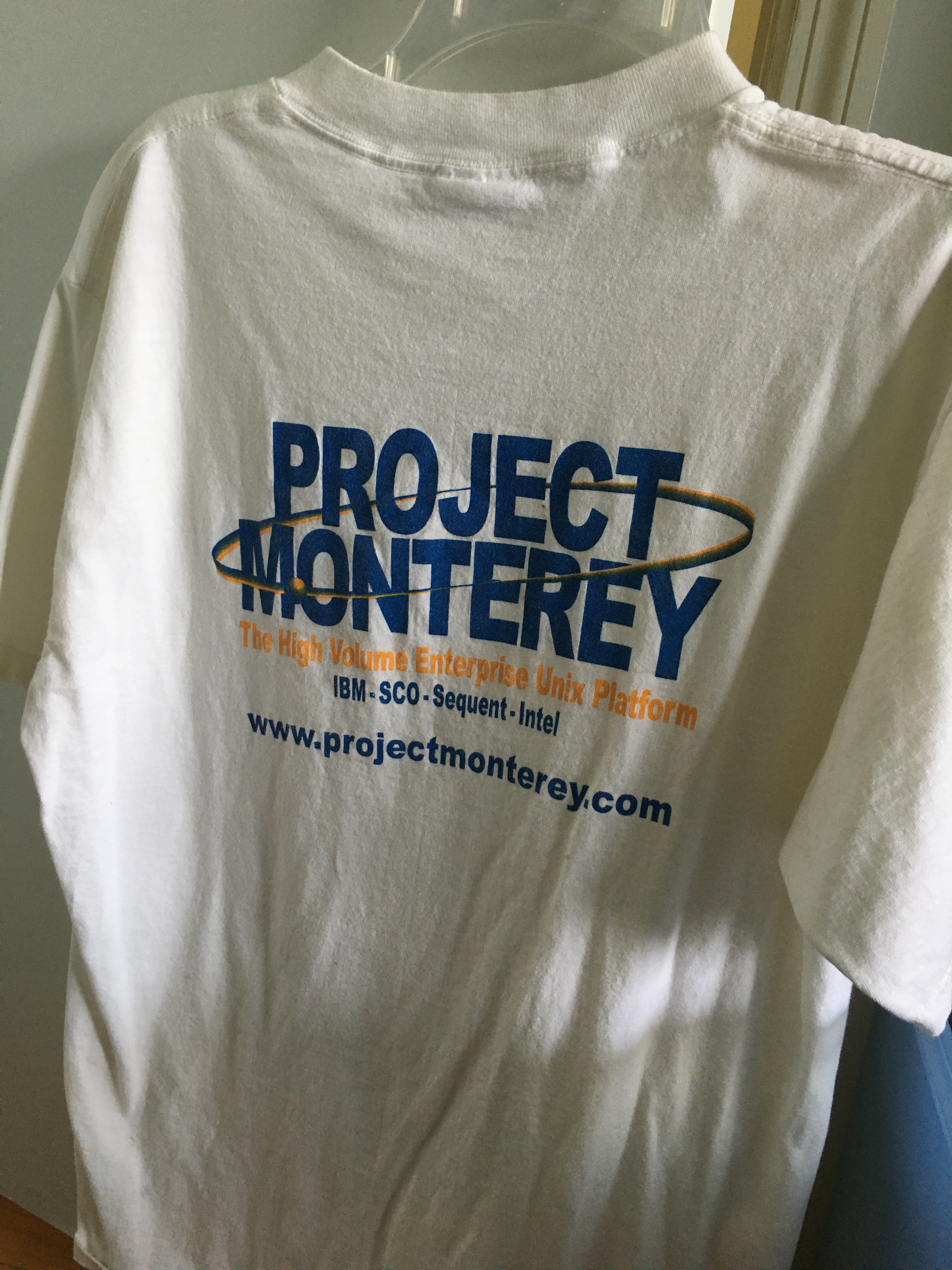
Project Monterey T-shirt given to employees of the companies involved

During the mid- to late 1990s, many in the computer industry believed that Intel's under-development 64-bit architecture, known as IA-64 and code-named "Merced", would dominate the marketplace once released. But the architecture was very different from IA-32 and migrating operating systems and tools to it was very expensive. SCO needed a well-funded hardware company to ally with; the earlier 3DA initiative with HP had failed, and discussions about SCO being compatible with the "Bravo Unix" from Compaq and its Digital Unix had not gotten far. When IBM proposed an alliance, SCO jumped at the chance to further bolster its entry into the enterprise space.

The core idea of Project Monterey was to take elements from IBM's AIX, Sequent's DYNIX/ptx, and SCO's UnixWare, to form a merged 64-bit Unix for Intel's Merced architecture. This merged OS was supposed to become available at the same time as Merced, in mid-2000.

Along the way, there would be stages of earlier deliverables. IBM pledged as part of the deal to make UnixWare 7 its Unix of choice for high volume IA-32 systems and to devote considerable efforts towards selling UnixWare 7 through its sales and marketing mechanisms. This would be aided by IBM including its middleware and some AIX technology into 32-bit UnixWare, and conversely some UnixWare technology would be incorporated into future versions of AIX. IBM would gain access to SCO's experience with Unix on Intel as well as access to SCO's reseller channel.

Part of the motivation for Monterey was another attempt by Unix vendors to show a clear advantage for Unix in the high-end enterprise space against Microsoft's latest NT offering, now being branded as Windows 2000 and scheduled to be available for Merced as well. Towards that end, Intel said they would create a multi-million dollar fund for ISVs to develop for the 64-bit Monterey. InfoWorld stated that IBM had "stunned the industry" with the move, in part because IBM was playing catch-up in the Merced space.

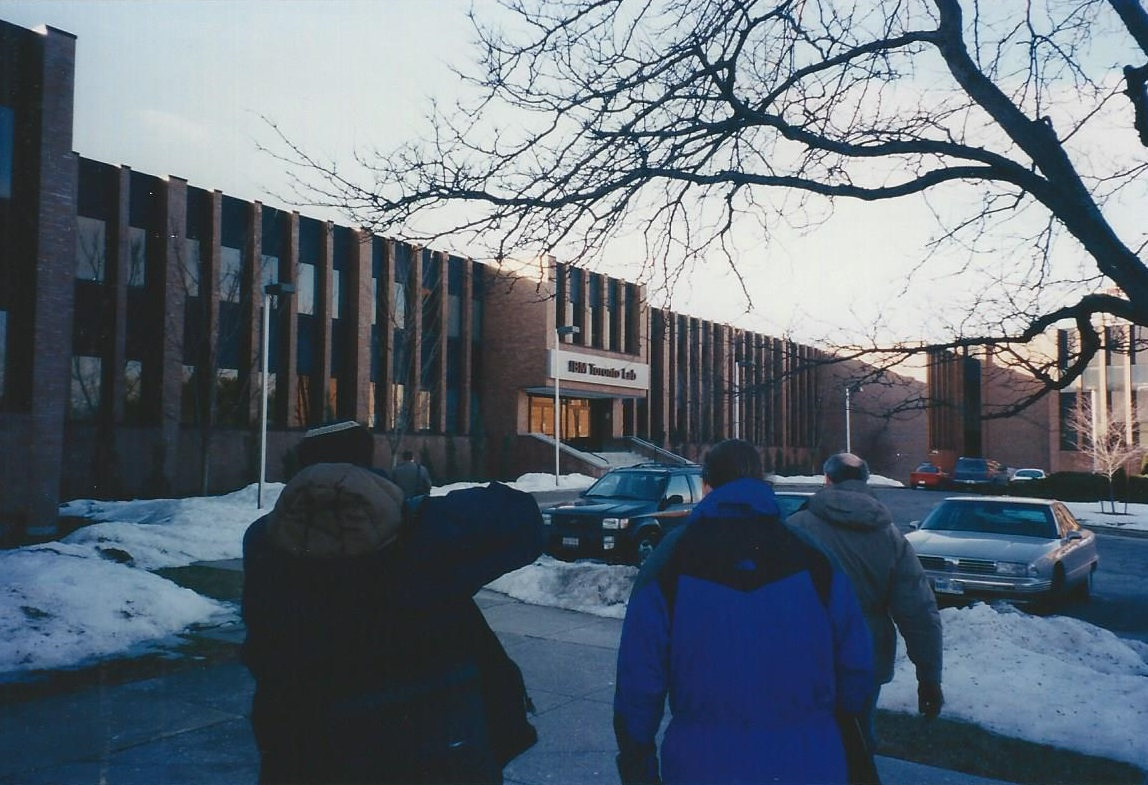
Several engineers from SCO's New Jersey office about to enter the IBM Toronto Lab in February 1999, in order to discuss aspects of Project Monterey

The project was announced by the involved companies on October 26, 1998, in New York. An IBM executive said, "IBM is totally committed to making this effort a success." One SCO executive said that Monterey was "probably the biggest deal SCO has done."

But not every industry observer was enthusiastic; the story about the deal in Computer Reseller News began, "Just what the world needs: another Unix." In any case, the project proceeded, with AIX becoming the dominant technology within it rather than UnixWare. By October 1999, a year after the announcement, the work-in-progress Monterey was said to be up and operational on early silicon versions of Itanium, as Merced was by then officially called, and able to run both 32-bit UnixWare binaries and 64-bit natively built binaries on it.

However, as 2000 began, things were changing at IBM, as there was a corporate-wide strategic initiative to get behind the open-source Linux operating system. A few months later IBM released a major upgrade to AIX, but instead of it being associated with Monterey, it was called AIX 5L with the 'L' indicating an affinity for Linux. It was clear to industry observers that IBM considered Monterey to be over with. IBM's decision to shelve Monterey left the SCO product line without a 64-bit Unix solution. Itanium was further delayed, and when it did come out, it failed to succeed in the marketplace; so Project Monterey was a failure from multiple perspectives.

=== Y2K surge and recede ===
The open-source-software movement was something that SCO had to be cognizant of, and for a number of years SCO Skunkware, a frequently updated collection of open source packages built for SCO platforms, had helped bridge the gap between the traditional and open source development worlds. Then in an attempt to deal with the growing popularity of Linux as a low-cost operating system, during 1999 SCO began offering consulting services for Linux. SCO also engaged in partnerships with, and investments into, various Linux companies. This included agreements to sell Linux distributions from Caldera Systems, SuSE, and TurboLinux, as well as a partnership to provide professional services to customers of TurboLinux server farms and an investment in the LinuxMall portal site. One motivation for some of these initiatives was an effort by SCO to enlarge its professional services operation, as by 1999 such activity only comprised about 5 percent of SCO's total revenues. Finally, a vice president for marketing was hired who had a Linux background.

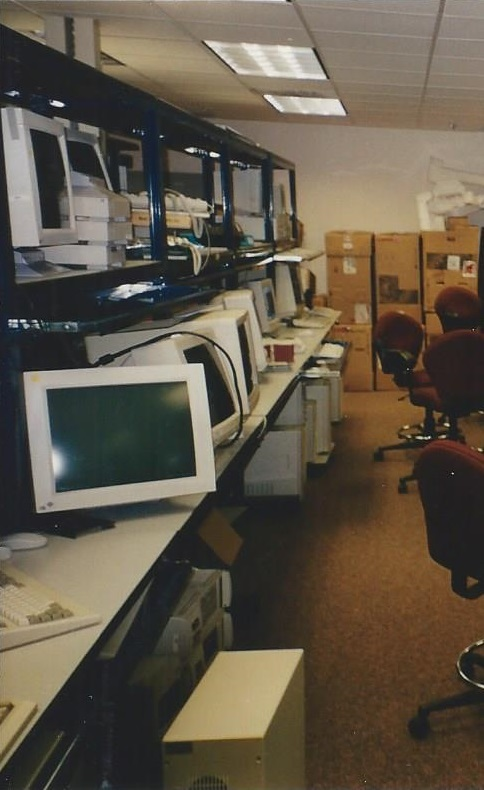
Unix on a PC: lab racks in the Murray Hill, New Jersey, office

During 1998 and 1999, much of the computer industry, including SCO, was focused on dealing with the Y2K problem. SCO saw a surge in sales as customers bought new, Y2K-compliant products and upgrades to replace the vulnerable software they were running. As a consequence, the company began reporting better financial results during 1999 and its stock began a slow upward climb, starting from a prior low point of 2 3/8. To meet the demand, SCO added more staff.

In October 1999, the company announced record earnings for a quarter and a year and its highest yearly revenue mark at $224 million. The results broke a four-year streak of SCO losing money. The company also had the best cash position in its history, with some $62 million in that form or in short-term investments. As a result, its stock price rose to a new high of 14 15/16. Michels expressed optimism, saying the year was "a turning point" and "the beginning of very strong ongoing business."

The growth spurt was fake, and the reality of it was we were stealing from our future. After Y2K, sales dropped like a rock. Customers were done upgrading. We had to cut staff. The stock dropped.

— Doug Michels in 2012, reflecting upon part of what led to the end for the Santa Cruz Operation.

The stock's biggest surge happened in mid-December 1999, when Steve Harmon, an influential analyst covering technology companies, went on CNBC and included SCO on his list of ten stock picks for 2000. The stock promptly jumped by 7 points, and in late December 1999 the stock reached an all-time high of 35 7/8. SCO's value was seen in having a solid core business with earnings and revenue; in having some kind of Linux play; and in having a new-technology, Internet-capitalizing product in Tarantella. An analyst for the GiGa Information Group agreed that SCO was a company to watch in 2000.

But the Y2K-based splurge would not last. In March and July 2000, SCO announced earnings shortfalls, with SCO's Unix products selling slowly once Y2K anxiety was past. The increasing popularity of Linux solutions had resumed taking its toll as well. By July, only seven months after its peak at over 35, the stock price had crashed to below 5. The company announced it was cutting costs as a result and that it had hired investment bankers Chase H&Q to explore "strategic combinations" with other companies.

Fundamentally, SCO was doing battle on one hand in a commercial software world increasingly dominated by Microsoft and on the other hand in a world where open source Linux was undermining commercial software itself. These two factors made constantly pleasing Wall Street investors with double-digit growth figures an imposing task. In particular, Linux posed an existential threat to SCO OpenServer's low-end marketshare; as one analyst said, "Linux can give you the same value proposition [as SCO] – a Unix on cheap hardware – for less money." And despite all the efforts, UnixWare had not been fully successful in competing in the high-end market, and now Linux was threatening UnixWare's share of that as well. As a result, by mid-2000, SCO's market position, and the company itself, was rapidly collapsing.

== Final history ==
=== Asset sale and change of name ===
In March 2000, at the time of the first announced earnings shortfall, SCO had reorganized into three divisions: Server Software, Professional Services, and Tarantella. The split was intended to highlight Tarantella as a product independent of SCO Unix, and was seen by industry analysts as a prelude to some or all of the divisions being sold. As one International Data Corporation analyst said, "SCO has to do something with their business model because their business is eroding."

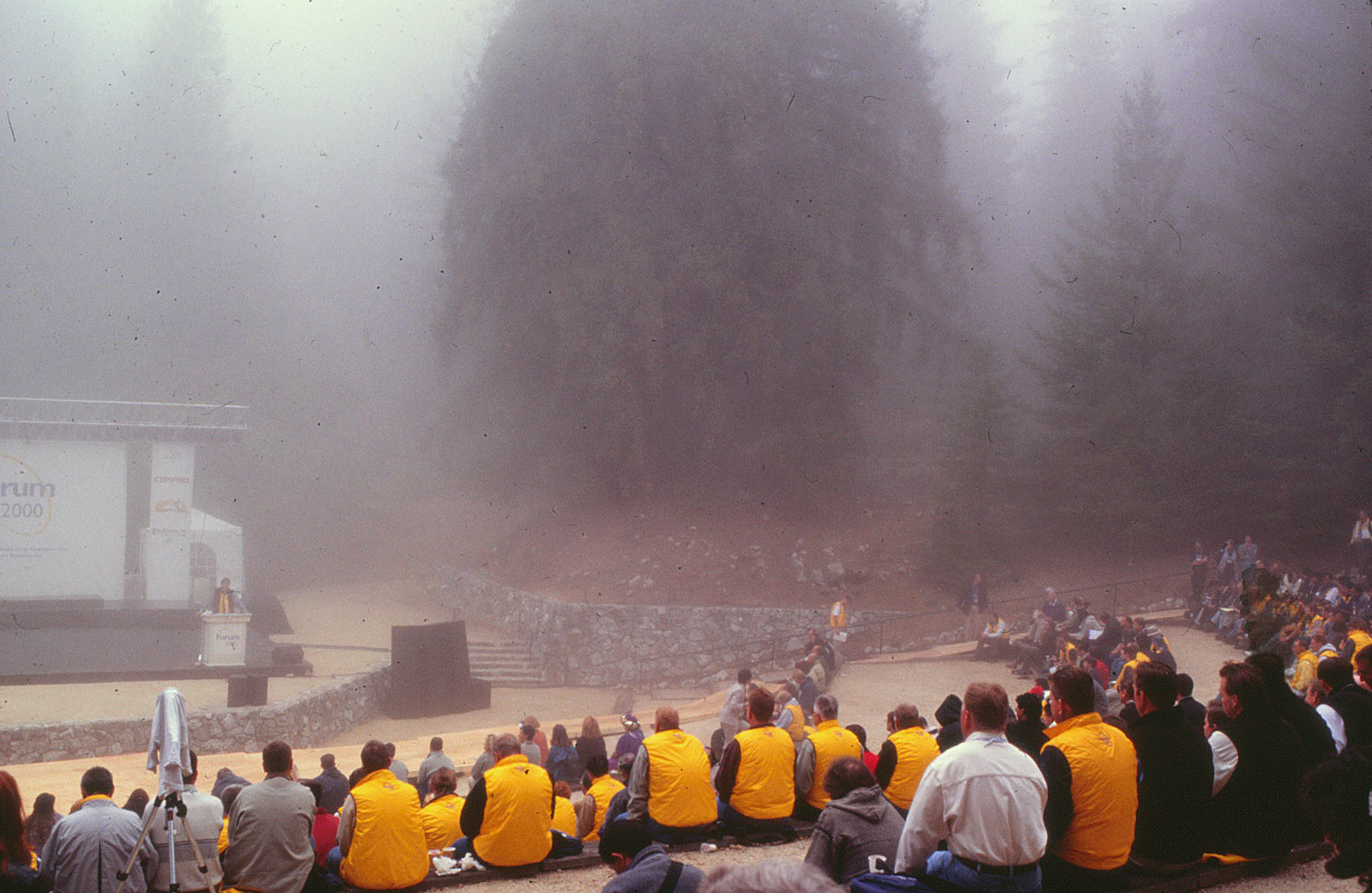
End of an era: Caldera Systems addresses the SCO community at Forum 2000.

On August 2, 2000, following several months of negotiations, SCO announced that it would sell its Server Software and Services Divisions, including UnixWare, to the Linux company Caldera Systems. The deal was complex, involving cash, stock, and loans, and difficult to evaluate monetarily, but based on the price of Caldera Systems stock at the time it was worth around $110–114 million.

The idea of the purchase from Caldera Systems' perspective is that it would gain access to SCO's large VAR channel; the value of such channels was well known to former Novell chief Ray Noorda, whose Canopy Group was funding Caldera Systems. The announcement that SCO was selling its Unix assets to a Linux distribution company represented, in the view of Eric Raymond, the completion of the move from the commercial Unix industry to the open-source movement. From Doug Michels' later perspective, the problem with Linux was not that it was open source and free itself, but rather that in August 1999, during the dot-com boom, the Linux company Red Hat had been able to get $400 million during their IPO and was not expected to make a profit anytime soon, while SCO was an established public company closely watched by the stock market that was expected to make a profit and had only around $50 million in cash. By this time, the SCO stock price was down around 2 1/2. Thus when the chance came to merge with Caldera Systems, which was in a generally similar position as Red Hat although with less cash, SCO took it.

SCO was much the bigger company, with 900 employees at that point to Caldera Systems' 120. Throughout the year there had been layoffs from SCO, including the shutting down of the Watford development office. In addition a number of longtime SCO employees chose to leave the company. An especially large layoff took place in September 2000, soon after the Caldera Systems announcement, when 190 employees were let go, comprising 19 percent of the company's workforce. This layoff included 40 employees in Santa Cruz itself.

The SCO acquisition was originally scheduled to close in October 2000, but got delayed due to concerns from the Securities and Exchange Commission regarding the details of the merger. However, the two companies' support organizations did get combined during this time. In addition, there was confusion among the SCO customer base about the fate of OpenServer. So in February 2001, the deal was renegotiated to include OpenServer in what was sold to Caldera Systems, although a percentage of OpenServer revenue would still go back to SCO. The monetary terms of the deal were adjusted as well, with Caldera Systems paying SCO more cash than in the original agreement.

Finally on May 7, 2001, SCO completed the sale of its Server Software and Services Divisions, as well as UnixWare and OpenServer technologies, to Caldera Systems. At that time Caldera Systems changed its name to Caldera International, and the remaining part of SCO, the Tarantella Division, changed its name to Tarantella, Inc.

=== Aftermath ===
The sale of the company's Unix assets and renaming of what was left marked the end of an era for not just SCO but the town of Santa Cruz as well. The staff going to Caldera moved into the 400 Encinal building while the newly named Tarantella occupied the 425 Encinal structure.

There were ironies in SCO's demise being largely from the effects of Linux, since SCO had been a pioneer of the open systems movement. As one writer stated, "In some ways, SCO was Linux before Linux, popularizing Unix on low-cost Intel machines."

In August 2002, Caldera International renamed itself The SCO Group since the SCO Unix products were still their greatest source of revenue due to the large installed base they had. That entity soon started the SCO–Linux disputes.

Those familiar with the Santa Cruz Operation, including those who worked there and those who wrote about it, became protective of that company's reputation, especially given the possible name confusion regarding the role The SCO Group played in the attacks on Linux. As former Santa Cruz Operation employee wrote later about The SCO Group, "I'll spare you the sordid legal details, but by then, it was no longer our SCO."

== Company culture ==
=== Santa Cruz atmosphere ===
The Santa Cruz Operation ... thoroughly reflected the ethos of the community for which it was named. ... SCO probably could have been a better-run company. My memory is that the stock analysts were fairly definite on that point, but it wouldn't have been nearly so much fun.

— Industry writer David Coursey in 2004.

From its inception and co-founding by UC Santa Cruz graduate Doug Michels, the company drew upon the readily available technical talent who chose to remain in the central California coastal town of Santa Cruz after graduating. But the town and university affected the company as well. SCO was at the center of the Santa Cruz tech scene, with many employees moving from it to other tech companies or vice versa. Some of the feel of the SCO offices was carried forward in coworking facilities later set up in Santa Cruz by two former SCO employees.

New products were promoted with mock film posters. The Vice President of Marketing and Communications was, through much of the 1980s and early 1990s, Bruce Steinberg, who was an artist and musician in the San Francisco area music scene, whose credits included having designed the "flying toasters" cover of the Jefferson Airplane's 1973 live album Thirty Seconds Over Winterland.

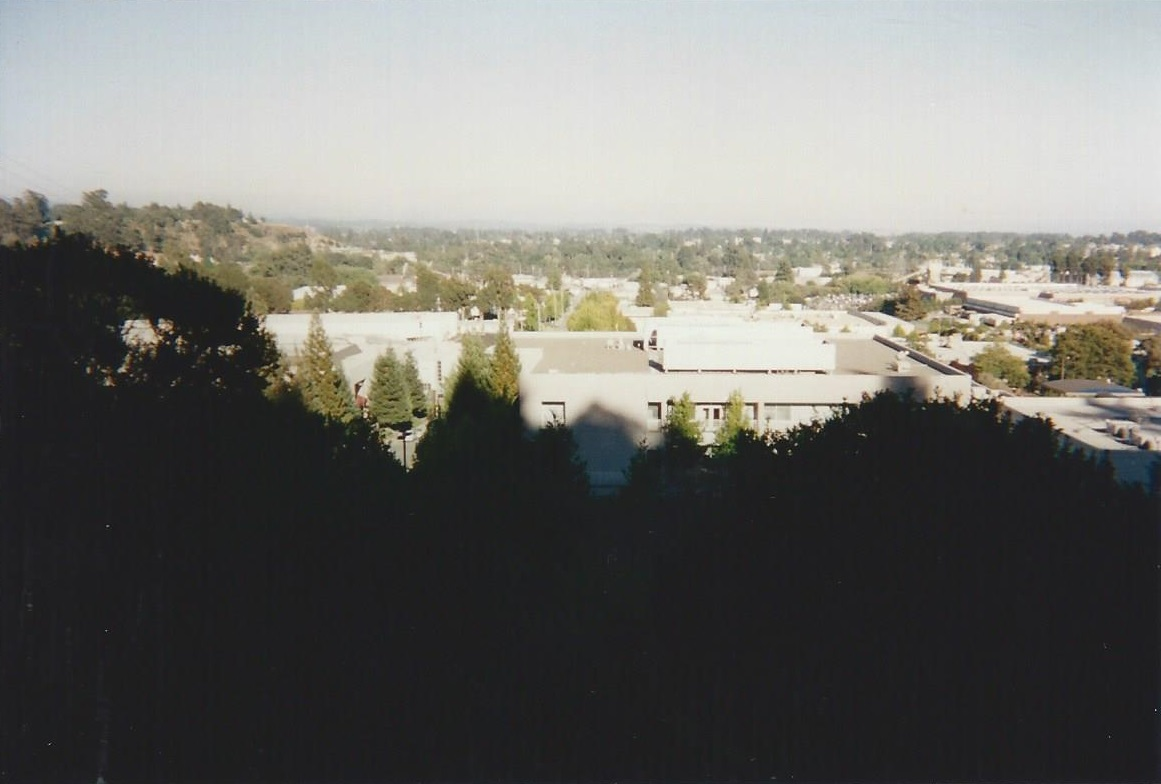
End-of-day meetings were held on these rooftops, here seen in 1999 from the hills behind them (center-right is 425 Encinal; on the left, mostly obscured, is 400 Encinal).

The Santa Cruz Operation name itself brought comments; one Canadian industry writer called it "One of the coolest company names I ever came across since entering this business".

From its earliest days through to its last ones, The Santa Cruz Operation was known for reflecting the casual ambience of its namesake town. Dress was casual to the point where some staffers went barefoot. There was beer in the office, end-of-day meetings held on Encinal Street roofs, and an outdoor hot tub at the Mission Street office (dating from the facility's previous existence as a holistic health clinic) that was used during the day or for late-night, after-work parties. One former employee said years later of her experience there, "It was a family. We played hard, but we also worked hard. I don't think I've worked anywhere since that's had that kind of feel." The SCO reputation was exemplified by an oft-related story of a time where the company had to put out a rule that "clothing must be worn during office hours," caused by an instance where someone walking in from the hot tub had not done so and a potential corporate partner had been paying a visit.

Over 500 former Santa Cruz Operation employees held a reunion at the Cocoanut Grove venue in Santa Cruz in 2012.

=== SCO Forum ===
Beginning in 1987, SCO hosted an annual Summer conference for the international Unix community. Called SCO Forum, it was held on the University of California, Santa Cruz's scenic redwood-forested campus overlooking Monterey Bay, drew some 2000–3000 attendees, and lasted for much of a week.

Featured speakers over the years included Douglas Adams, Scott Adams, Dave Barry, Clifford Stoll, John Perry Barlow, Linus Torvalds, Andy Grove (Intel), Michael Swavely (Compaq), Steve Ballmer (Microsoft), and Scott McNealy (Sun Microsystems). Musical entertainment included concerts by Jefferson Starship, Tower of Power, Roger McGuinn, Jan & Dean, The Kingsmen, The Surfaris, and Deth Specula.

SCO Forum was noted as one of the best such conferences to go to in the industry and was viewed fondly by those who attended. It was the largest tech event in the Santa Cruz area and made a multi-million dollar impact on the local economy.

=== Palookaville webcasts ===
Following the first live Internet concert in 1994, SCO continued in that tradition by sponsoring and producing a series of live Internet webcasts from the popular Santa Cruz night club Palookaville. These webcasts demonstrated the use of UnixWare 7 as a real-time audio and video webcasting server utilizing RealAudio and RealVideo technologies from RealNetworks.

=== Trapping a hacker ===
SCO was a target of one of the most publicized security hackers of the 1980s and 1990s, Kevin Mitnick, who broke into the company's systems in 1987. SCO's staff detected his intrusions and engaged in exchanges with him that allowed them to track his activities. After about a week of this, it appeared that the intruder was trying to modify or copy Xenix code. Authorities having been notified, the phone line Mitnick was using for the intrusions was discovered and he was arrested. He reached a deal to plead to a misdemeanor for which he did no jail time, but it was his first conviction as an adult. SCO officials agreed not to sue him if he would explain his hacking techniques to them. But when a SCO staffer traveled to meet him, he was uncommunicative. In any case, Mitnick soon continued his intruder activities against other companies' systems.

=== SCO Follies ===
From 1985 to 2001, the company hosted a Winter Solstice party at the Cocoanut Grove in Santa Cruz featuring a live musical show known as "The SCO Follies". This was a fully scripted and produced satire skewering SCO management and the high-tech industry. It featured live action, musical numbers, and videos. On September 22, 2012, the SCO Alumni Association hosted the SCOGala Reunion party at the Cocoanut Grove, which included the first SCO Follies since 2001. Some 500 former employees, friends, and family attended the event.

Year	Title	Description
1985	Star Trek	Scripts in hand, early SCO employees go where no company has gone before.
1986	unknown	-
1987	unknown	-
1988	Cheers	Sometimes you want to go where no-one knows your login name.
1989	Larry Wants an Ad	Exasperated with Bruce Steinberg's hairbrained ideas, Larry Michels asks employees to submit concepts for a new ad campaign.
1990	Late Night with Doug Michels	SCO licenses the "Late Night" format from GE with Doug as host. Guests include the XENIX Colonel, Michael J. Foxplus (promoting "Backup to the Future II"), SCO's own Princess of Purple, and (direct from the mail room) "Elvis".
1991	KODT	SCO launches a cable television channel that requires a telethon to raise funds for the equally cash-strapped organization (operating under the banner of "almost" public television).
1992	Archaeological Dig	The year is 2100 and the world has only recently recovered from a catastrophic era known as "The Corporate Wars". Drs. Dave Loman and Jane Greenleaf are recovering artifacts from the original SCO site in New Santa Cruz. The archaeologists are working under the supervision of an overbearing AI known as the NED 9.0.1 Project Management System, and Michelle Michels, descendant of the founders of SCO. With a little hacking, a kinder, wackier NED makes for a much less stressful work environment.
1993	How to Succeed in the Software Business	Job applicant Grace Hopper joins the company via social engineering. With the help of a book on the software business, Grace hopscotches across the SCO org chart with stints in Manufacturing, Support, Engineering, Sales, and Marketing. Meanwhile, VP and co-founder Doug Michels is rescued from a car crash and imprisoned by a deranged ex-SCO employee named Annie Wilkes. Grace is ultimately made CEO, but turns it down for a better job. This show includes the infamous "Die Hard" video by late Follies action director Peter (Israel) Rosencrantz. In the current climate, it's hard to picture a CEO giving permission for employees to parade through the building carrying automatic weapons, let alone appearing in the video himself. But Swedish-born Lars Turndal sat for an hour with guns trained on him by some wacky Americans as if he'd been doing it all his life.
1994	The Phantom of the Operation	Software engineer Eric T. Claudin runs afoul of evil VP Edwin Vincent Leach, who is bent on SCO's destruction. Disfigured in a hot tub "accident" arranged by Leach, Eric becomes the Phantom, a dark figure obsessed with saving the firm. Once again, then-CEO Lars Turndal proved he was a real sport and consented to appear in his second (and last) video, one that roasted the executive team for trying to censor the Usenet feed. Brian Moffet produced the stained-glass style panorama that opens the show.
1995	FCS Can Wait	For the uninitiated, FCS is "First Customer Ship," the magic goal of the product development cycle. Based on the films "Here Comes Mr. Jordan" and Heaven Can Wait," Engineering manager Jo Pendleton is hurled into the great void ahead of schedule. Bodies must be swapped and Heaven & Earth must be moved so that Jo can complete her project of a lifetime, "SCO DoomBugger".
1996	UNIX Won't Die	After a series of high-profile incidents involving glitches in the UNIX operating system (namely Apollo 13, Three Mile Island, and the Exxon Valdez), James Bond tracks the SPECTRE of his nemesis Ernst Stavro Blofeld into the hallways of SCO. Along for the ride is the mysterious Tilly Masterson (sister of the woman who was suffocated in paint by the nefarious Goldfinger). Software engineer Fox Mulder and Dana Sculley ("a schmuck from Legal") have stumbled onto the UNIX plot and are suspicious of Bond's presence. This show was the first to include digital compositing (a couple of laser beams and explosions). These early steps were taken on a Miro DC20 video card and Adobe Premiere purchased with pooled funds. Bill Welch created these effects and Mike Almond provided the opening Star Wars animation using Caligari TrueSpace. Thereafter, nearly all the effects for Follies were created digitally.
1997	Taming of the CEO	A Shakespearean romp where Viola Murch, a top female director who despairs of ever becoming a VP, decides to disguise herself as a man. She learns that the top floor is a far stranger place than she imagined. This show included a mock preview for a show called "Sliders" about parallel SCO universes. This marked the full use of digital effects and compositing. Mike Almond was responsible for creating such 3D items as a phalanx of Imperial Stormtroopers and a streaking Millennium Falcon.
1998	A Solstice Carol	The story of Ezekiel Kludge, a crusty longtime SCO manager who re-discovers the true meaning of SCO.
1999	The Wizard of OCS	IBM engineering manager Dorothy Gale is transported into the wacky world of OCS, where she meets a Marketeer who wants to lose his brain, A Salesman who wants to get rid of his heart, and an Engineer who wants to get rid of his life.
2000	Willy Wonka and the Software Factory	Support specialist Charlotte Bucket dreams of visiting SCO's Software Factory and Willy Wonka, the "Chief Geek" who no-one has seen for years. It's an adventure populated with Corpa Lorpas, Waffling Precompensators, Paleoatavistic Patch Pellucidators, and Everlasting Spamstoppers. Not to mention Fizzy Linux stocks. And some arrogant, selfish, and greedy adult children get their comeuppance as well.
2001	Fiddler on the 425 Roof	The "final" SCO Follies occurred shortly after Caldera Systems purchased the Santa Cruz Operation. Thus the show's theme is change, with Caldera Systems as the Cossacks. The show opens with the "Dawn of Spam" sequence adapted from Stanley Kubrick's classic odyssey. The mood of the "Linux Company" finale was subsequently overturned when the radically downsized, later-named "SCO Group" turned against Linux.
2012	Raiders of the Lost Archive	When two members of a secret SCO organization are murdered, the SCOllegium assigns a team of ex-SCOites to find out who is responsible.

== Alliances ==
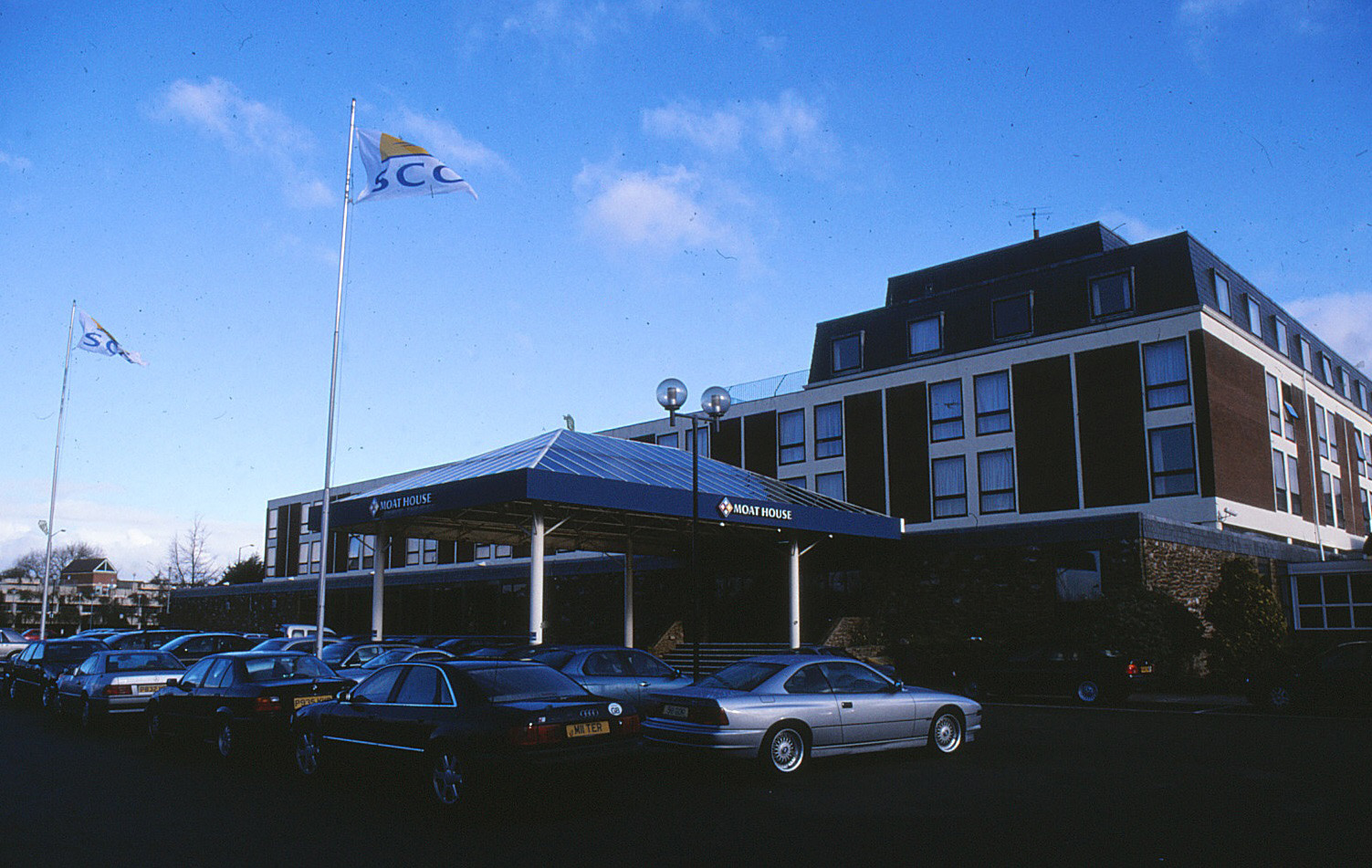
The SCO Partner Conference was a yearly conference held for Santa Cruz Operation partners in the United Kingdom and sometimes elsewhere. The 2000 edition took place at a hotel in Stratford-upon-Avon with the SCO flag flying in front of it.

SCO was a primary partner in several industry alliances, intended to promote SCO operating system technology as a de facto standard for emerging hardware platforms. The most notable of these were:

- The ACE Consortium: Founded by Compaq, Microsoft, MIPS Computer Systems, Silicon Graphics, Digital Equipment Corporation, and SCO in 1991, to drive the next generation of PCs powered by the Advanced RISC Computing Specification (ARC)
- 3DA: Formed by SCO and Hewlett-Packard in 1995, to define the standard Unix for IA-32 and later IA-64 systems
- Uniform Driver Interface: Led by SCO and with work starting in 1997, the UDI project sought to establish an OS-neutral and platform-neutral portable interface for writing device drivers. The UDI project had the backing of Intel, HP, IBM, Compaq, Sun, and others.
- Project Monterey: Formed by SCO, IBM, Sequent and Intel in 1998, to define the standard UNIX for IA-64 systems. Also intended to merge some of the proprietary Unix products afloat at the time.

None of these alliances were ultimately successful.

SCO was also part of 1993's COSE initiative, a more successful and broadly supported initiative to create an open and unified UNIX standard.

SCO was a founding member of 86open (1997–1999), hosting the first meeting of the Unix on Intel standards effort.

== See also ==
- Halloween documents
- History of Unix
- Timeline of operating systems
- Xinuos for the current owners of the SCO-related Unix products
