= 3DA =

Mid-1990s Unix development alliance

3DA was an alliance formed between The Santa Cruz Operation (SCO) and Hewlett-Packard (HP) in September 1995. Its purpose was to unify SCO's OpenServer product, UnixWare (newly acquired from Novell), and HP-UX from HP; the resulting product would then become the de facto Unix standard for both existing x86 systems and the upcoming IA-64 processor architecture from Intel.

In September 1996, SCO announced that they were offering a "code-level preview" of the system, codenamed Gemini.

By 1998 the alliance had ground to a halt, setting the stage for Project Monterey.
