= Mark Bolzern =

Founder of early Linux communities

Mark Bolzern is one of the original pioneers of both the Internet, and of the Linux computer operating system. Bolzern was the founder of early Linux-specific community portals such as LinuxNews, LinuxMall, LinuxPro, LinuxGuru and PenguinPower. Bolzern was also the creator of the original plush Tux mascot, based on the original drawing by Larry Ewing. His work at LinuxMall allowed Bolzern to directly affect the Linux community with LinuxMall's support of various Linux events. His achievements play a significant role in the story of the book Rebel Code by author Glyn Moody

== Education and career ==
Bolzern graduated in 1976 from West Anchorage High school where, among other things, he first worked with a Monroe 1880 that was programmed via graphite marked cards in Octal and started his fascination with computers. Later Bolzern attended UAA (University of Alaska, Anchorage). During his studies there in the late 1970s, he helped test an early statewide multi-campus e-mail system. After a short year at Cal Poly Pomona (California Polytechnic State University), he transferred to UAF (University of Alaska, Fairbanks) where he studied Electrical Engineering and also played with the Data General Nova computer system used in the development ALOHAnet, where low level error correcting packet protocols CSMA/CD were pioneered, which are now fundamental underlying protocols of TCP/IP, Ethernet, WiFi and the Internet.

After being denied access by administrators, Bolzern cracked the University of Alaska statewide computer network in 1978, doing something they didn't think was possible by a standard user. He used the central Honeywell 66 in Fairbanks to send emails to all system users inviting them use his software to participate in an Apple II user group via an early shared account he created, and then set up group communication via mailx (Mail Extended) an enhanced version of the standard Unix command mail. It was these extended features that Bolzern was able to use to create one of the first Bulletin Board Systems (BBS) in history.

The Apple access (terminal emulation, etc.) was performed free via software called UACNCAP written and distributed by Bolzern and an associate that made any Apple II with an original model Hayes 300 baud modem into a remote terminal for this GCOS system, later an IBM PC version called PC Communicator (By Bolzern, before PC-Talk) was released as well. GCOS was a very early variant of Unix, and is why the field in Linux where the user's full name goes is called the GCOS field.

Bolzern also used this software himself to continue accessing the system from his third-floor Lathrop Hall dorm room, via wires to the one phone for the entire floor, down the hall. Also from anywhere else he happened to be with his Apple II and Hayes Modem, as well as to communicate with his family back home via email, and continued after graduation in 1981 with a Bachelor of Science in Electrical Engineering. What Bolzern had created at UAF soon became used by university teachers and students for years thereafter.

While at UAF, Bolzern worked at Motorola as an installer and radio technician, and after graduation he took a job with IBM after scoring second highest of anyone else hired that year on the qualification exams. While at IBM he quickly learned how to repair just about any office equipment that IBM had at the time and was influential in recognizing the value of the desktop PC. He ultimately, with IBM management support, resigned IBM and moved to sales of the new machines at ComputerLand, where he sold the first 50 or so PCs delivered within the State of Alaska.

General Computer Services, Inc. (GCS) was founded in 1981, and incorporated on September 17, 1982. It was Bolzern's consulting company for anything and everything PC-related. He created commercial Job Cost and Estimating software, created an early ISP (Internet Service Provider) for the State of Alaska. It was during this time that he founded the Anchorage PC and Compatibles User group which later became Alaska Computer Society and also “Computer Talk” the World's first (as far as we know) radio talk show about computers.

After moving to Aurora, Colorado, Bolzern worked and advised with the Colorado Department of Education, where he built a statewide legislation notification system and helped get computers into the public school system, and then USWest with Unix and Informix SQL database systems for accounting and information management. He also travelled as a speaker on many topics related to computers.

It was in the early 1990s that Linux was born and Bolzern soon became one of the more outspoken advocates for development and adoption.

WGS (Work Group Solutions) was founded in Aurora, Colorado on June 23, 1993, originally as a subsidiary of GCS. Its big/main achievement was introducing the first commercially-sold software for Linux, Flagship, which was a Clipper compiler for Unix. Then shortly thereafter, LinuxPro. LinuxPro was one of the better known distributions or distros of the early years of Linux. Even winning a Best of Comdex Award (1995) presented by noted science fiction writer Jerry Pournelle.

WGS shortly thereafter received a letter stating the company was being sued for using the word Linux, by a mental patient that had trademarked it. Up until then, Linus Torvalds had said he wanted the word Linux to be freely available for anyone. Unfortunately, that could only be achieved by having a non-profit group administer it.

Phil Hughes (of Linux Journal), John "maddog" Hall (Of Digital Equipment Corp), and Bolzern, among others, assembled a group to fight the lawsuit; eventually it was settled by outright giving the trademark directly to Linus Torvalds, with his agreement that LI (Linux International) would manage it. John "maddog" Hall, and Bolzern made sure that the trademark was put into Linus's name who by agreement made Linux International (LI) the perpetual administrator. What was then Linux International has since morphed into the Linux Foundation.

In late 1995 Bolzern founded the Colorado Linux Users and Enthusiasts (CLUE) bringing local high school students in Aurora, CO and businesses who were interested in Linux together with others who used Linux and presented on many topics. Activities included Linux install fests allowing new users to learn more about Linux and the various distros available along with more about the power of open source programs and specifically Linux.

In May and June 1998 articles Bolzern wrote were published regarding the Linux Base System project and commenting on the growth of the Linux Community.

WGS transitioned into LinuxMall in about 1996, and was by 2000 a firm of 60 employees based in Aurora, Colorado, and the "largest online shopping center with software and products for the Linux computer operating system." It was expected to have an initial public offering, but a stock market downturn led, instead, to a reverse acquisition in which it was bought for $25 million by Ebiz Enterprises, an already-publicly listed firm, which was to change its name to LinuxMall.com after the transaction.

From April to March 2000, several articles were published by and about Microsoft in relation to Linux with several penned by Bolzern himself, In addition under the PenguinPower name many collectables designed by Bolzern were manufactured by LinuxMall such as this Tux pin being worn by Peter H. Salus.

Unfortunately, the growth of LinuxMall was cut short in the early 2000s by the bursting of the tech bubble and non-delivery of a 10 million dollar check the VCs had said was already in the mail, and the subsequent merger activities. Bolzern himself semi-retired to travel with and take care of his wife Virginia who was stricken with cancer.

As of February 2012 Mark Bolzern now serves as Chief Technical Officer at Northern Utility Services, LLC in Anchorage, Alaska where he originally grew up. This Autobiographical page also has more details regarding Mark's professional achievements.

As of March 2024 there are several years of history still missing, but I can bring this up to date by referring to a post by Mark Bolzern himself on Facebook:https://www.facebook.com/mbolzern/posts/10229078346090971

== Causes and philosophy ==
Bolzern's involvement in what ultimately became the Linux Foundation was significant. His work includes LI, which Bolzern initially structured as a vendor organization, responsible for the LSB (Linux Standard Base), LPI (Linux Professional Institute) professional Linux certification, and Linux Trademark administration, among other things.

== Family ==
Born in Zurich, Switzerland, the Bolzern Family (Father, Mother, Mark) arrived from Spain via ship along with their VW bus, immigrating via Ellis island just after it permanently closed.

Bolzern and his family arrived in Alaska via Florida, Texas, and California, where his brother Ronald was born, and after waiting for the Alaska Highway to open arrived in Anchorage in 1962, just prior to the famous 1964 earthquake. He was naturalized as a U.S. Citizen along with his parents on June 17, 1966,

Bolzern spent several years out of the limelight traveling with and caring for his wife Virginia who was dealing with breast cancer until her death on March 8, 2007. During that time they were both involved in an Encouragement Ministry called BBtJ
