= Internet Underground Music Archive =

Online unsigned artists organization (1993 – 2006)

- Website type: Online music archive
- Website: IUMA web site
- Commercial: No
- Registration: Optional
- Launched: 1993; 33 years ago
- Current status: Defunct

The Internet Underground Music Archive (IUMA) was an organization that provided a venue for unsigned artists to share their music and communicate with their audience. IUMA is widely recognized as the birthplace of online music. IUMA's goal was to help independent artists use the Internet to distribute their music to fans while circumventing the usual distribution model of using a record company. IUMA was started by Rob Lord, Jeff Patterson and Jon Luini from the University of California, Santa Cruz in 1993.

== Overview ==
IUMA originally existed as FTP and Gopher sites, before the World Wide Web was widely used. On March 9, 1994 CNN featured IUMA in their "Showbiz News" segment. In June 1999, IUMA was purchased by EMusic, and moved operations from Santa Cruz to Redwood City, home of the EMusic offices. IUMA provided artists who registered with a free URL and web page. The artists could present their music over the Internet in stream, download, and internet radio format. Further, it provided an easy-to-use home page for the band and the ability to distribute their music with no bandwidth fees. Some of the original file formats used to encode the music were WAV, AIFF and MP2. MP3 was added later as that format became more popular.

In 2000, IUMA offered US$5,000 to couples who named their baby "Iuma". Several families took up the offer. IUMA flourished, hosting events such as "Music-o-mania", the largest online "Battle of the Bands" ever held. The winners were given rock star treatment, flown to San Francisco to open for Primus at the Fillmore auditorium.

IUMA was subsequently purchased in 2002 by Vitaminic, an Italian music company.

Early in 2006, the IUMA website disappeared from the Internet. The site had already been closed to new submissions since 2001, when EMusic downsized, eliminating most of the IUMA staff. Despite this setback, much of IUMA's core group continued to work on a "volunteer" basis, in the hopes that IUMA could be resurrected.

In late May 2012, Jason Scott (founder of Textfiles.com) announced that much of IUMA's collection has been reposted via the Internet Archive. John Gilmore, co-founder of the Electronic Frontier Foundation (EFF), managed to retrieve the surviving files before its shutdown.
