= Caldera International =

American software company

Caldera International, Inc.

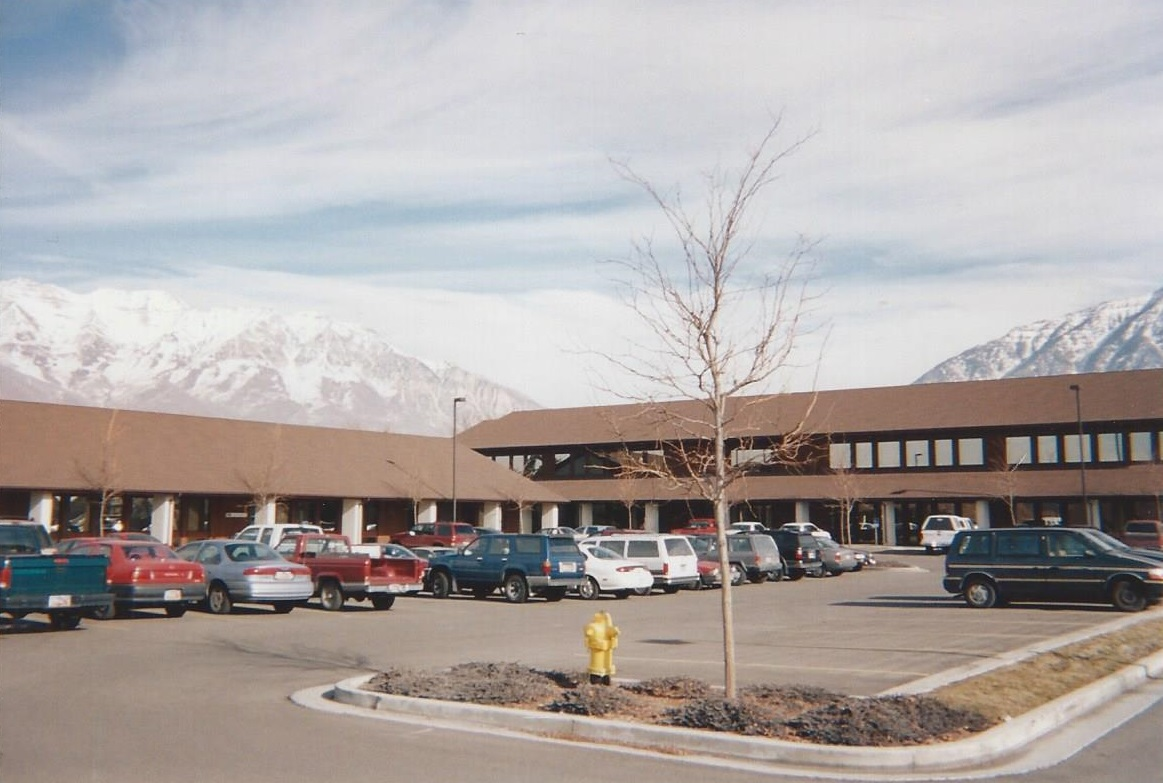
- Caldera International headquarters office in Orem, Utah
- Formerly: Caldera Systems, Inc. (1998–2001)
- Type: Public
- Traded as: Nasdaq: CALD
- Industry: Operating system software
- Founded: Orem, Utah (1998; 28 years ago)
- Defunct: 2002; 24 years ago
- Fate: Restructured
- Headquarters: Orem, Utah, United States
- Number of locations: Santa Cruz, California; Murray Hill, New Jersey; Watford, England; others
- Key people: Ransom H. Love, President and CEO; Drew Spencer, CTO
- Products: Caldera OpenLinux, UnixWare, OpenServer, Volution Manager, Volution Online, Volution Messaging Server
- Number of employees: 120 (2000); 664 (ca. May 2001); 618 (2001); 400 (2002); 388 (2002-07-31)
- Website: www.caldera.com

Caldera International, Inc., earlier Caldera Systems, was an American software company that existed from 1998 to 2002 and developed and sold Linux- and Unix-based operating system products.

Caldera Systems was created in August 1998 as a spinoff of Caldera, Inc., with Ransom Love as its CEO. It focused on selling Caldera OpenLinux, a high-end Linux distribution aimed at business customers that included features it developed, such as an easy-to-use, graphical installer and graphical and web-based system administration tools, as well as features from bundled proprietary software. Caldera Systems was also active in the Java language and software platform on Linux community.

In March 2000, Caldera Systems staged a successful IPO of its stock, although the stock price did not reach the stratospheric heights of its chief competitor Red Hat and some other companies during the "Linux mania" of 1999.

In August 2000, Caldera Systems announced the purchase of Unix technology and services from the Santa Cruz Operation (SCO). The much larger, merged company changed its name to Caldera International when the deal closed in May 2001.

In the end none of these efforts succeeded in the marketplace, and Caldera Systems/International lost large amounts of money in all four years of its existence. Under severe financial pressure, in June 2002 Love was replaced as CEO by Darl McBride, who soon adopted the corporate name The SCO Group and took that entity in a completely different business direction.

== Caldera Systems ==
=== Background and formation ===
Caldera, Inc., based in Utah, was founded in 1994 by Bryan Wayne Sparks and Ransom H. Love, receiving start-up funding from Ray Noorda's Canopy Group. Its main product was Caldera Network Desktop (CND), a Linux distribution mainly targeted at business customers and containing some proprietary additions. Caldera, Inc. later purchased the German LST Software GmbH and its LST Power Linux distribution, which was made the basis of their following product Caldera OpenLinux (COL).

Caldera, Inc. inherited a lawsuit against Microsoft when it purchased DR-DOS from Novell in 1996. This Caldera v. Microsoft action related to Caldera's claims of monopolization, illegal tying, exclusive dealing, and tortious interference by Microsoft.

On September 2, 1998, Caldera, Inc. announced the creation of two Utah-based wholly owned subsidiaries, Caldera Systems, Inc. and Caldera Thin Clients, Inc., in order to split up tasks and directions. Caldera Systems, whose actual incorporation date had been August 21, 1998, took over the Linux business, including development, training, services, and support, while Caldera Thin Clients (which changed its name to Lineo the following year) took over the DOS and embedded business. The shell company Caldera, Inc., remained responsible for the lawsuit only.

=== "Linux for Business" ===
Caldera Systems was headquartered in Orem, Utah, and was headed by co-founder Ransom Love as President and CEO. Caldera Deutschland GmbH, based in Erlangen, Germany, served as their Linux development center. Drew Spencer joined in 1999 and became the company's Chief Technology Officer.

The company targeted the Linux-based software business with its Linux distribution named Caldera OpenLinux, and the Caldera Systems business plan stressed the importance of corporate training, support, and services. Towards this end they created a professional certification program for Linux as well as for the KDE desktop that the Caldera Systems distribution used. In doing so they worked with the Linux Professional Institute in developing class materials and created a series of Authorized Linux Education Centers around the globe that would train successful students towards doing well in Linux Professional Institute Certification Programs. Beginning courses trained on several difficult Linux distributions as well as Caldera OpenLinux, while more advanced courses focused on OpenLinux only (the name OpenLinux tended to annoy other Linux distributions, suggesting as it did that the others were not open).

The early leader in the Linux as a business race was Red Hat Software, which attracted equity investments from several major technology companies in early 1999. Red Hat also tended to get the most media attention. Besides Red Hat and Caldera, other well-known companies selling Linux distributions included SuSE, Turbolinux, and Mandrake Soft. But no company at the time had been successful in building a profitable business around open source software.

Caldera Systems focused on a high-end Linux product and its Linux distribution became rich with features with bundled proprietary software. For instance, the company offered NetWare for Linux, which included a full-blown NetWare implementation from Novell. They licensed Sun Microsystems's Wabi to allow people to run Windows applications under Linux. Additionally, they shipped with Linux versions of WordPerfect from Corel as well as productivity applications from Applixware. Since many of their customers used a dual boot setup, Caldera shipped with PowerQuest's PartitionMagic to allow their customers to non-destructively repartition their hard disks.

This approach led to a debate about the purity of Linux-based products. Red Hat CEO Bob Young said in 1999, "One where you might see a problem is Caldera, because they see part of their value added in proprietary tools they have licensed from third parties." In response, a Caldera Systems executive expressed the company's philosophy: "We have produced a product that combines the best of open-source and commercial packages; we are doing Linux for business. We do add to it commercial packages that allow business users to easily integrate it."

Caldera OpenLinux was also available on a retail basis, in the form of a CD-ROM for installing Linux on an IBM PC compatible machine that sold for US$49.

OpenLinux 2.2, released in April 1999, was seen as significantly improved from the previous year's 1.3 release, especially in terms of it having a fully graphical and easy-to-use installation feature. Ease of installation was an important criteria in selecting a Linux distribution, and Caldera Deutschland had created this first fully graphical installer for Linux, called Lizard, starting in November 1998. Several years later it was still receiving praise from reviewers. The installer could even be started from a Microsoft Windows partition.

Industry writer Hal Plotkin praised Caldera as a product development company and noted that OpenLinux won several industry awards, including 1999 product of the year from Linux Journal.

=== Other products and projects ===
In addition to other people's applications, Caldera Systems created many Linux extensions to fill voids where no other commercial company was.

Caldera Systems created a full-featured GUI system administration tool called Caldera Open Administration System (COAS) that was deployed during 1999. The tool was a unified, easy to use administration tool with a modular design and goals of scalability and broad scope applicability, and was expressly designed to be usable on other Linux distributions in addition to Caldera Systems'. Following that, Caldera Systems sponsored the development of browser-based Unix system administration via the webmin project between 1999 and 2001. It became the first Linux distribution to include Webmin as the standard tool for system administration.

Caldera Systems was a leader in the adoption of the Java language and software platform on Linux. The Blackdown Java project, which first produced working Java ports for Linux systems, was featured on Caldera OpenLinux. In 2000, Caldera Systems was one of the companies elected to the inaugural JCP Executive Committee for Java SE/EE, which guided the evolution of Java language and software platform through the Java Community Process. Caldera Systems' role on the Executive Committee included representing the Linux and open source communities.

The company was re-elected to its seat on the Executive Committee after it became Caldera International, and represented Java usage on SCO Unix platforms as well. Work to improve just-in-time compilation under the Sun "Classic JVM" for SCO Unix platforms that begun under SCO was completed with Caldera International. Caldera Systems was also involved in several Java Specification Requests, including being the specification lead for JSR 140, Service Location Protocol API for Java, and participating in the JSR 48 WBEM Services Specification.

=== Investments and IPO ===
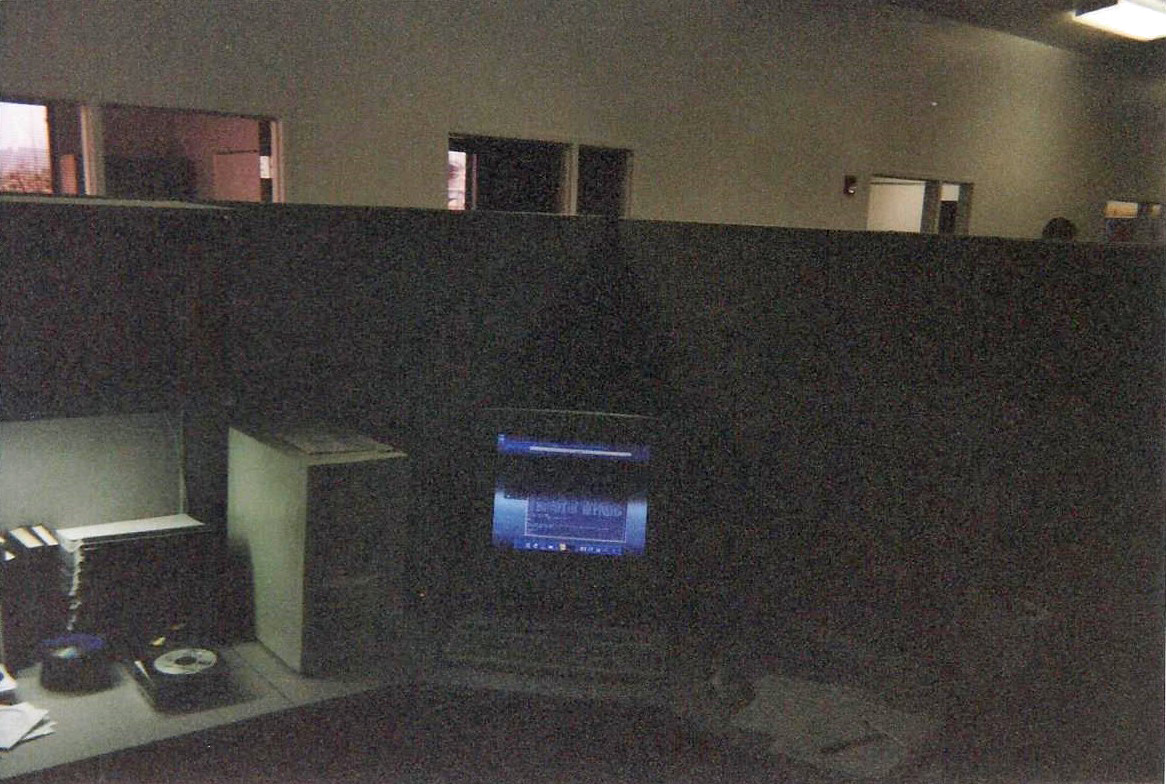
Workplaces and offices within the Caldera Systems headquarters

Caldera Systems had not been profitable; for the company's 1998 fiscal year, ending on October 31, it had a loss of $7.9 million on revenue of $1.05 million, and for its 1999 fiscal year, it had a loss of $9.3 million on revenue of $3.05 million. However, the industry saw promise in Linux as a solution for businesses, and in the latter half of 1999 a "Linux hysteria" had erupted in the stock market, with first Red Hat in August 1999 and then Cobalt Networks and VA Linux in November and December 1999 having experienced huge jumps in value during their first day each of trading.

On January 10, 2000, three things happened, all of which were coincidental. A settlement to the Caldera v. Microsoft suit over DR-DOS was announced, with Microsoft paying former parent company Caldera, Inc. an amount estimated at $275 million (which turned out to be $280 million). Caldera Systems received a $30 million private equity investment from a group of companies that included Sun Microsystems, Novell, Citrix, Santa Cruz Operation, Chicago Venture Partners, and Egan-Managed Capital, with the goal to "fund operations and accelerate the growth and acceptance of Linux." Also, Caldera Systems announced that it would be filing to have an initial public offering. Ransom Love said that the Microsoft settlement would not benefit Caldera Systems other than that Caldera, Inc. would relinquish the name "Caldera", which would address existing industry confusion between the two. Reports at the time also indicated that the settlement would not directly benefit Caldera Systems, but that Caldera Systems could get an intangible benefit from a name association with a company that had bested an industry giant. Love also said that the timing between the funding round, work for which had begun six months earlier, and the IPO announcement was "unfortunate, and completely coincidental".

Caldera Systems reincorporated in Delaware on March 6, 2000. By this point it was well positioned in some respects, such as having a strong relationship with Sun and receiving good product reviews within the industry. But it suffered from a lack of public awareness; as IDC analyst Dan Kusnetzky said, "They have a wonderful demo, and the product looks very good. But if you asked people on the street about Caldera they would probably think you are talking about a volcano in Hawaii."

The company then staged an IPO of its common stock, with the symbol CALD. On the first day of trading, March 21, 2000, Caldera Systems' shares doubled in value, going from an initial price of $14 to close at $29 7/16, with heavy trading been seen and an intra-day high of $33. The IPO raised $70 million for the company and gave it a market capitalization of $1.1 billion.

While the launch was successful on its own terms, analysts saw signs that the Linux mania was finally cooling, abetted by Red Hat and VA Linux having seen their values steadily decrease since their spectacular starts. So, while some observers viewed the IPO as a success, others viewed it as a disappointment. Red Hat continued to dominate in North America, with an over 50 percent share of the Linux market.

== Caldera International ==
=== Acquisition of SCO UNIX ===
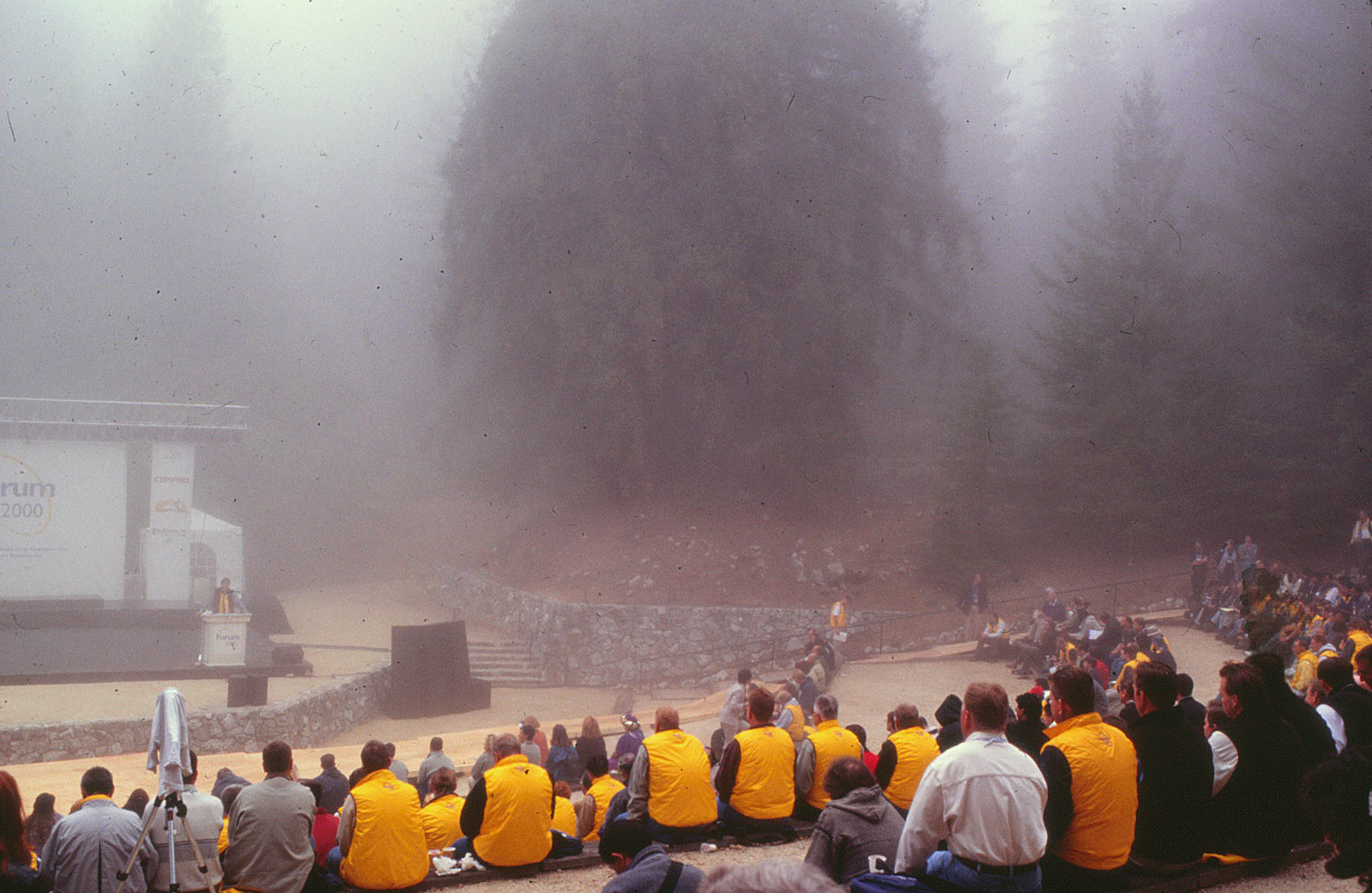
Caldera Systems CEO Ransom Love speaking to the assembled SCO user and reseller community during the opening keynote addresses of the Forum 2000 conference in the quarry amphitheater of UC Santa Cruz

Placard describing the merged operations of Caldera Systems and Santa Cruz Operation, 2000

On August 2, 2000, following several months of negotiations, Santa Cruz Operation announced that it would sell its Server Software and Services Divisions, including UnixWare – its most technically advanced proprietary Unix operating systems for Intel commodity hardware – to Caldera Systems. (The agreement was phrased in terms of Caldera Holding, Inc., a typical Newco in such transactions.) The annual SCO Forum conference of developers and resellers at the University of California, Santa Cruz, held later that month, had its name shortened to just "Forum".

The deal was complex, involving cash, stock, and loans, and difficult to evaluate monetarily, but based on the price of Caldera Systems stock at the time it was worth around $110–114 million. SCO was much the bigger company, with 900 employees to Caldera Systems' 120. But SCO had been in distress; in part due to the advent of Linux, a series of previously good financial results had gone sour for the company as 1999 turned into 2000. As Forbes magazine stated, "Questions remain about execution, but the deal is at least a temporary life preserver for SCO, whose flagship UnixWare server software was in danger of eventually becoming irrelevant in the face of Linux."

As Caldera Systems saw it, Unix and Linux were complementary rather than competitive technologies, especially in the sense that SCO Unix represented a good back-office and database solution while Linux specialized in networking. The deal gave Caldera Systems access to partnerships with Compaq Computer and IBM, both of which resold UnixWare, and also meant Caldera Systems would become the world's largest vendor of Unix licenses. SCO also had thousands of business applications running on it targeted to vertical markets. In addition, Caldera Systems saw SCO's role as one of the OS companies involved in Project Monterey as a means to develop a 64-bit computing strategy.

But a primary reason for the acquisition was to get SCO's 15000-strong reseller channel. Caldera Systems had been emphasizing trying to get into much the same VAR channel business that SCO was in, using the argument that resellers could find larger margins with free software than by selling Microsoft's Windows NT. But it had been a difficult sell against SCO; even when Linux outperformed SCO Unix, the idea of switching vendors and support organizations made resellers reluctant to make the move.

So combining these channels was seen as a solution to this problem. As the president of iXorg, a reseller organization focused on SCO, stated, "The real value that Caldera will get from the deal is not the Unix name, not the [SCO] customer base, not even the technologies. It is the reseller channel." Skeptics noted, however, that many of those listed resellers were probably not that active anymore, especially in light of SCO's recent struggles (it had reported a $19 million quarterly loss a week before the acquisition announcement). Traditional SCO users were leery of the move, but Love tried to reassure them that the SCO Unix operating systems would continue on: "Why would we buy it to destroy what we buy? That wouldn't make any sense."

There were hurdles to be overcome, including a fair amount of enmity for SCO within the Linux community. A major question became whether Caldera Systems would make the SCO-acquired Unix source code open source. Ransom Love initially said, "While we're having to look carefully at the licensing, we're going to open up the [UnixWare] source as much as possible, and at least some of it will be under" the GNU Public Licence. But there was pushback on the idea from the UnixWare staff in New Jersey, and in addition the license issues involved proved formidable. Love later said, "at first we wanted to open-source all of Unix's code, but we quickly found that even though we owned it, it was, and still is, full of other companies' copyrights. The challenge was that there were a lot of business entities that didn't want this to happen. Intel was the biggest opposition."

Instead, there was a focus on SCO's Linux Kernel Personality (LKP), a layer that conformed to the Linux Standard Base specification which would allow applications built for Linux to run on SCO's UnixWare. This was seen as both a way to capture more applications for Unix, and as a way to increase the performance of high-end applications. The latter factor was because SCO UnixWare had an advantage over Linux at the time in terms of support for 16- and 32-way symmetric multiprocessing, UnixWare NonStop Clusters, and some other high-end operating system capabilities. Indeed, one SCO product manager said that some Linux applications could run several times faster under UnixWare with LKP than they could under native Linux.

The SCO acquisition was originally scheduled to close in October 2000, but got delayed due to concerns from the Securities and Exchange Commission (SEC) regarding the details of the merger. However, the two companies' support organizations did get combined during this time. In addition, there was confusion among the SCO customer base about the fate of its other operating system, SCO OpenServer. So in February 2001, the deal was renegotiated to include OpenServer in what was sold to Caldera Systems, although a percentage of OpenServer revenue would still go back to SCO. The monetary terms of the deal were adjusted as well, with Caldera Systems paying SCO more cash than in the original agreement. Analysts were skeptical that these multiple operating systems could be managed without considerable difficulties being encountered.

Financial pressure on the company continued; for fiscal 2000, ending on October 31, Caldera Systems lost $39.2 million on revenue of $4.3 million.

=== "Unifying Unix with Linux for Business" ===
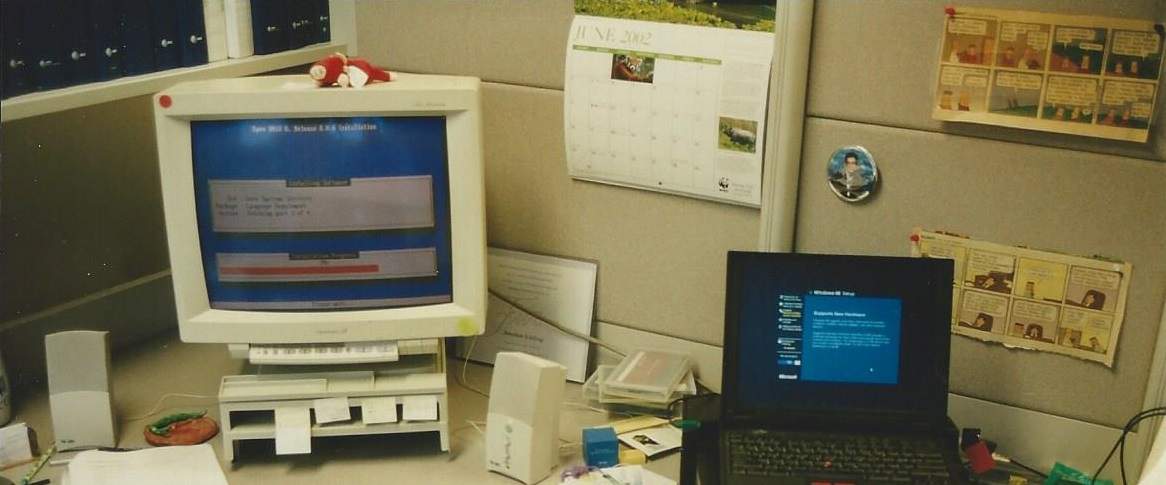
A desk at Caldera International's Murray Hill, New Jersey, showed the renamed Open UNIX 8 being installed.

The merger was originally being done under the name of the holding company Caldera, Inc., Then on March 26, 2001, during the CeBIT conference in Germany, Caldera Systems announced that it would be changing its name to Caldera International once the SCO acquisition was complete. By this point, the length and difficulty of the acquisition process had alienated some longtime SCO customers and partners.

The acquisition closed on May 7, 2001, and the new Caldera International name became effective. The merged company had major offices in not just Utah, but also Santa Cruz, California, Murray Hill, New Jersey, and Watford, England, as well as smaller facilities in 16 additional countries. Thus included in late May 2001, Caldera International, with investments of Fujitsu and Hitachi, opening the Caldera K.K. (カルデラ株式会社) subsidiary, directed by Makoto Asoh, who had previously run Nihon SCO, in Tokyo, Japan, which had been one of two SCO subsidiaries in that country. Overall, SCO had an infrastructure presence of some kind in 80 countries, whereas Caldera Systems had always been largely domestic, thus in part the rationale for the name change.

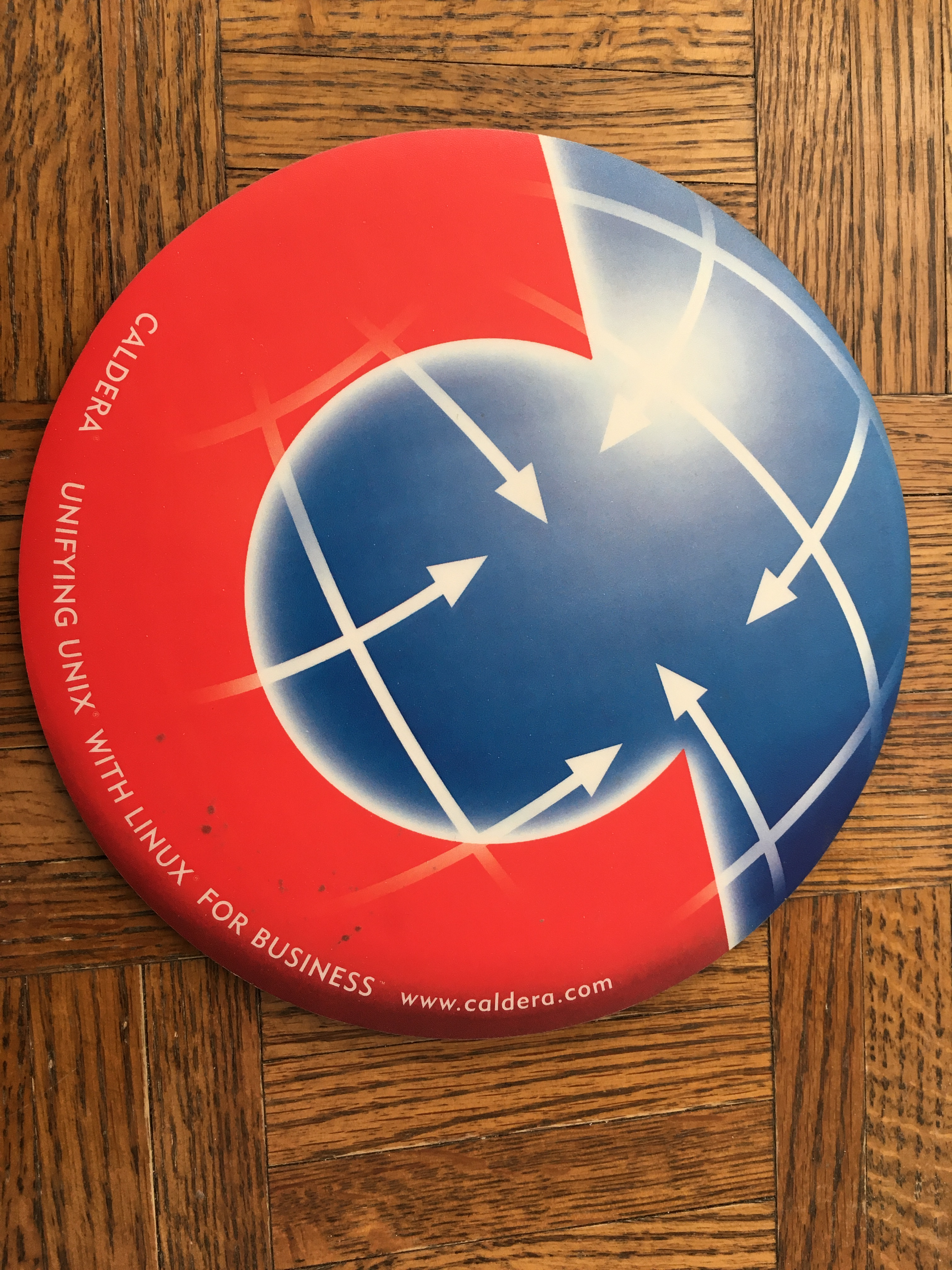
Mouse pad with the "Unifying Unix with Linux for Business" slogan

"Unifying Unix with Linux for Business" became the company's new marketing slogan. In light of that, the company began the Caldera Developer Network, which was intended to give developers of all kinds "early access to UNIX and Linux technologies, allowing them to develop on UNIX, on Linux or on a combined UNIX and Linux platform."

Caldera International's initial release of UnixWare was renamed Open UNIX 8. This release was what would have been UnixWare 7.1.2. While it may have been done to make the branding more consistent with OpenLinux and Open Server, it confused people as well as build and installation scripts that tested for system name. Later, the newly renamed SCO Group reverted to the previous UnixWare brand and version release numbering, releasing UnixWare 7.1.3.

In terms of the question of making some of UnixWare open source, in August 2001 Caldera International did announce that it was placing the code for the regular expression parser and the grep and awk commands, as well for the AIM Multiuser Benchmark, under the GNU General Public License. It also said it would begin an "Open Access to Open UNIX 8" program to allow developer partners to read-only viewing of unencumbered parts of the source base.

But overall, Caldera International found itself in a classic business problem where the interests of the existing business conflicted with their growth model. SCO Unix was mature and sold itself (mainly to repeat customers and replicated sites). The VAR relationship was even more problematic. Even though the reseller organizations had been combined, in reality the prior SCO resellers made much more from each SCO Unix sale than from sales of Caldera OpenLinux, so they were not anxious to move existing customers from Unix to Linux. And even those that were supportive of Linux, did not necessarily see a strong value add for Caldera International products and could often sell Red Hat Enterprise Linux instead.

=== Volution ===
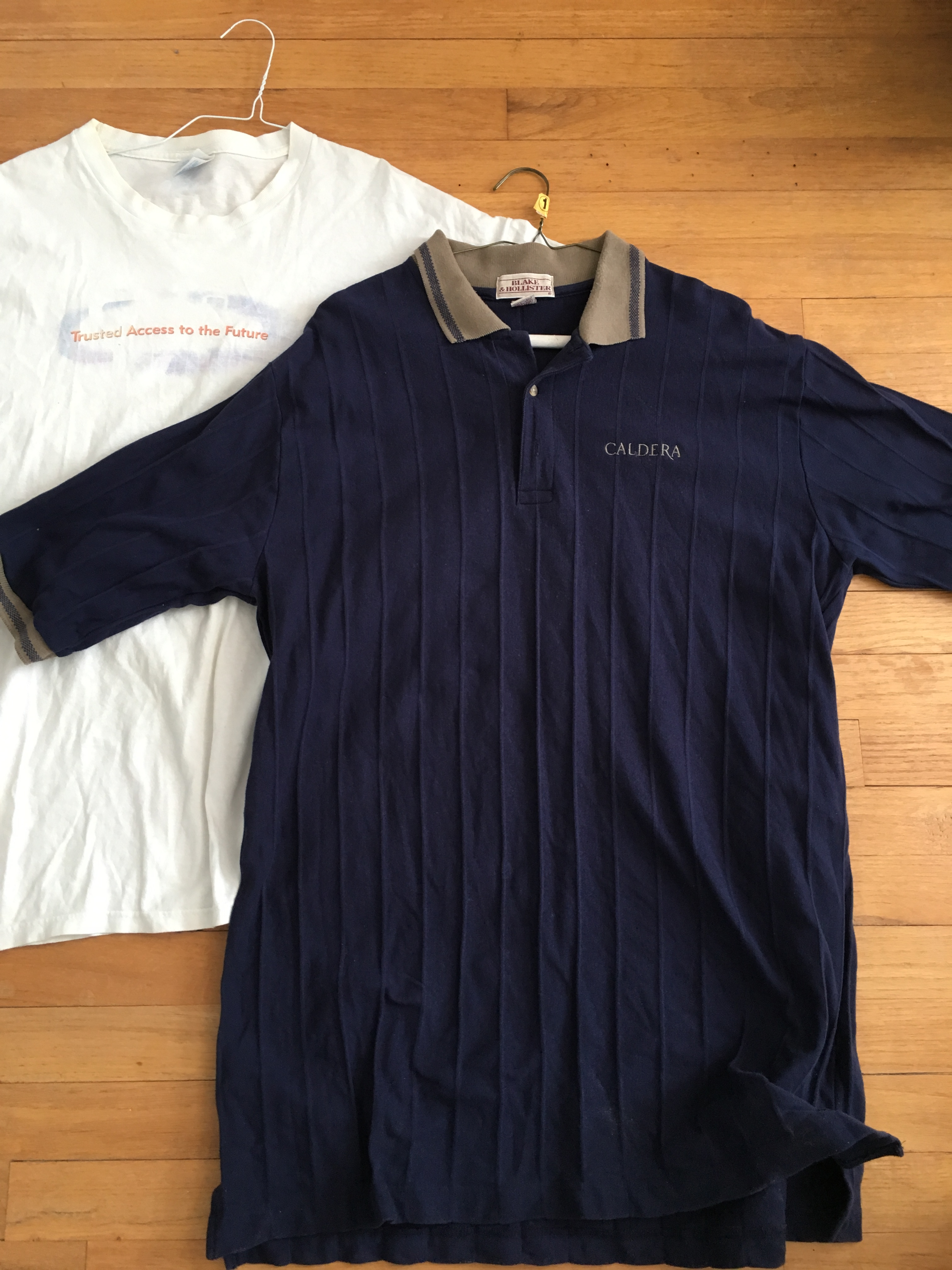
Caldera polo shirt and T-shirt, c. 2001

The Volution program was created out of the desire to create a layer of functionality on top of Linux, and Open UNIX 8 Linux Kernel Personality, that would add value to the operating systems offerings. It would end up having four main components: Volution Manager, Volution Messaging Server, Volution Online, and Volution Authentication Server, with an effort to build a common console for a unified user experience. As Ransom Love said, "Volution is a complex and extensive platform".

In January 2001, Caldera Systems first shipped Volution Manager, a browser-based systems administration solution. Intended for service providers and corporate accounts, it was based around OpenLDAP and Novell eDirectory. It featured some sophisticated functionality, but its initial user interface was limited in some ways and the product was costly.

Caldera Systems made a deal in February 2001 with Acrylis, Inc., a company based in Chelmsford, Massachusetts, to offer Acrylis's subscription-based service that allowed system administrators to test and then update Linux systems over a network. The service also delivered alerts to customers regarding the necessity for upgrades. The effort was an attempt to compete with the Red Hat Network service and gain a source of recurring revenue. Then in May 2001, Caldera International bought the WhatifLinux technology and assets outright from Acrylis, and changed the name of the service to Volution Online.

Caldera Systems had earlier begun work on a Linux equivalent to the Microsoft Exchange Server that was aimed at the small to medium business market. This would eventually become the Volution Messaging Server, which was released in late 2001 for use on Caldera OpenLinux and Open UNIX 8 with LKP. It offered shared calendaring and scheduling options, SSL support for e-mail, simple configuration, and integration with Microsoft Outlook. However, there were already a number of mail servers available for Linux and none of them had taken off in the business market.

Caldera Systems, and then Caldera International, had substantial experience with Web-Based Enterprise Management (WBEM), and its OpenWBEM implementation won the Best Open Source Project Award at LinuxWorld Conference and Expo in February 2002. That, combined with experience in the Kerberos authentication protocol and the difficulties of Windows–Unix integration, led Caldera International into research and development of an overall authentication solution that would find its place among Active Directory, LDAP, Kerberos, and WBEM. The product of this work was the Volution Authentication Server, which allowed the management of Unix and Linux authentication via Active Directory.

=== United Linux and continued decline ===
When Caldera OpenLinux 3.1 Workstation was released in June 2001, it was with the requirement for per-seat licensing. This was part of what continued to bring criticism of Caldera in some quarters of the open source and free software communities; Free Software Foundation founder Richard Stallman subsequently said of Ransom Love, "He's only a parasite", to which Love took umbrage, responding, "Did Richard Stallman ever invest £50m in Linux? We did. I have been involved in the Linux community since my time at Novell in 1994. … I am not a greedy capitalist. I am only a businessman. … You can't call our business model parasitic. We add value to Linux, so it can become successful. … I know that the open source movement has no clue about marketing, they underestimate it."

United Linux was an attempt by a consortium of Linux companies to create a common base distribution for enterprise use and minimize duplication of engineering effort. and form an effective competitor to Red Hat. The founding members of United Linux were SuSE, Turbolinux, Conectiva, and Caldera International. The consortium was announced on May 30, 2002. The UnitedLinux distribution would be based mostly SuSE Enterprise Linux rather than Caldera OpenLinux. The Caldera product name was changed to "Caldera OpenLinux powered by United Linux", which as one Network World writer observed, was "certainly never going to become a catchphrase." UnitedLinux did attract some major hardware vendors in support, such as Hewlett-Packard, Intel, and AMD, with the goal of creating a uniform Linux distribution by the end of 2002.

However, as CNET technology reporter Stephen Shankland wrote at the time, "UnitedLinux is widely viewed as an effort by second-tier Linux companies to gain the critical mass held by Linux leader Red Hat, but industry watchers are skeptical it will triumph." Other users saw the venture as more of a marketing move by a group of companies that were in difficulty. Intimations that UnitedLinux would also feature per-seat licensing were unpopular in the broader Linux community, and SuSE for their part said they had no such plans.

Overall, the fortunes of Caldera International had been steadily declining, the SCO–Caldera combined total revenue having decreased from $170 million in 1999 to $70 million in 2001. The company was consistently reporting losses; for the third quarter of its fiscal year in 2001, for instance, it reported a net loss of $18.8 million against revenue of only $18.9 million. In the following quarter they took a large write-down of the assets acquired from SCO, as they could no longer be accounted for as having the value they were originally thought to possess. For the fiscal year ending on October 31, 2001, Caldera International reported a loss of $131.4 million based on revenues of $40.4 million (the loss included a total amount of write-down and other non-cash and restructuring charges of $98.6 million).

The Linux side of Caldera International was bleeding funds; it was spending $4 for each $1 it received in revenue. The only Linux distributor company that was doing even passably well at the time was Red Hat. Caldera International's UnixWare and OpenServer business continued to be focused on small and medium-sized businesses and replicated sites, the latter largely being represented by retail or franchise-based companies such as CVS Pharmacy, Kmart, Pizza Hut, Pep Boys, Nasdaq, and others. A typical deployment scenario was that of McDonald's, which had a server running SCO OpenServer in each store that collected data from point-of-sale devices and relayed it to corporate headquarters while also providing access to corporate applications. An example of Linux Kernel Personality being used was Shoppers Drug Mart, which used it to run a SilverStream Software application server on UnixWare.

In part Caldera International's problems were due to the economic environment surrounding the collapse of the dot-com bubble; investors were very reluctant to put additional monies into unprofitable start-up companies. The additional effects of the early 2000s recession were especially difficult for high-tech companies, with information technology spending slowing to a near halt. Overall the SCO side of the business often saw customers making do with what they had rather than buying anything new.

The Caldera stock price was well under a dollar and NASDAQ was threatening to delist it. Financial analysts stopped their coverage of the company. On March 14, 2002, Caldera engaged in a 1-for-4 reverse stock split in order to get the stock price back over a dollar and avoid delisting. Also in March 2002, Caldera International moved its headquarters from Orem to Lindon, Utah.

Several rounds of layoffs took place during this time. There was one in April 2001 that resulted in 32 employees losing their jobs. In September 2001 there was a layoff of 8 percent of the company's workforce, reducing it from 618 to 567 employees. A localized layoff hit the Santa Cruz office in April 2002. An especially broad, 15 percent layoff in May 2002 affected all areas of the company, with 73 people being let go and around 400 employees remaining. Offices in Chelmsford, Massachusetts and Erlangen, Germany were closed, representing what had been the development sites for Volution Online and the original Caldera OpenLinux. At the same time, the company's CTO, Drew Spencer, also departed. Plans to continue the company's annual Forum conference for the international SCO Unix community in Santa Cruz were scrapped, with instead a GeoForum event announced that would be held in multiple locations around the world and in Las Vegas, Nevada in the United States.

Despite having earlier done the reverse stock split, as well as a stock buyback, in late June 2002 Caldera International received another delisting notice from NASDAQ. The company had less than four months' cash for operations. As Wired magazine later wrote, the company "faced a nearly hopeless situation."

== Change of management, name, and direction ==
On June 27, 2002, Caldera International had a change in management, with Darl McBride, formerly an executive with Novell, FranklinCovey, and several start-ups, taking over as CEO from Ransom Love. At the same time, Caldera International said it would buy back its stock owned by Tarantella, Inc. and MTI Technology, thereby relieving itself of the obligation to pay a percentage of OpenServer revenue past a certain point to Tarantella. Love became head of Caldera International's role in the United Linux effort. IDC analyst Dan Kusnetzky said that while the United Linux role was important, the removal of Love from the CEO post could be seen as "moving him away from the controls at Caldera to let someone else take over."

Changes under McBride happened quickly. On August 26, 2002, it was announced that Caldera International was changing its name back to SCO, in the form of the new name The SCO Group. (The final legal aspects of the name change did not become complete until May 2003.) This reflected recognition of the reality that almost all of the company's revenue was coming from Unix, not Linux, products.

The product name Caldera OpenLinux became "SCO Linux powered by UnitedLinux" and all other Caldera branded names were changed as well. The Volution Messaging Server product was retained and renamed SCOoffice Server, but the other Volution products were split off under the names Volution Technologies, Center 7, and finally Vintela.

From the start of his time as CEO, McBride had considered the possibility of claiming ownership of some of the code within Linux. Love had told him, "Don't do it. You don't want to take on the entire Linux community." But by October 2002, McBride had created an internal organization "to formalize the licensing of our intellectual property". Within a few months after that, SCO had begun issuing proclamations and lawsuits based upon its belief that its Unix intellectual property had been incorporated into Linux in an unlawful and uncompensated manner, and had stopped selling its own Linux product. The SCO–Linux disputes were fully underway, and SCO would soon become, as Businessweek headlined, "The Most Hated Company In Tech".

Interviewed later in 2003, Ransom Love – by then no longer in the Linux business either – said that SCO might have a legitimate argument regarding some specific contractual issues, but that lawsuits were rarely helpful and that "Fundamentally, I would not have pursued SCO's path."

== Legacy ==
Caldera played an important role in Linux history by establishing what would be necessary to create a mainstream, business-oriented system, with stability and support, out of the Linux kernel. Along with Red Hat and SuSE, it was the most important of the commercial Linux distributions. And as Glyn Moody wrote in Rebel Code: Linux and the Open Source Revolution, Caldera Systems' announcement in 2000 that it was buying SCO Unix – and with it code that dated back through Unix System Laboratories and AT&T before that – was the final marker for the ascendency of Linux over the Unix old guard: "The hackers had triumphed over the establishment."

But from a business perspective, the Caldera Systems acquisition of SCO Unix has been treated less kindly in retrospect. In 2016, ZDNet ranked it ninth on its list of the worst technology mergers and acquisitions of all time. In any case, the one true success story to come out of business-oriented Linux distributions was Red Hat, who at the time maintained they were competing against Microsoft, not Caldera Systems or the other distributions, and which set several marks for revenue for an open-source oriented business before being acquired by IBM in 2018 for $34 billion.

Perhaps the most successful technology venture to come out of Caldera International was the Volution Authentication Server, which under the Vintela name achieved considerable success. Vintela itself was bought by Quest Software for $56.5 million in 2005, and the Vintela software became a core part of that company's One Identity product.

As Dave Wilson, CEO of Vintela, later said, "Caldera Systems … played a major role in establishing Linux as a serious technology in our industry, and the people who worked for Caldera Systems are very proud of their achievements. Many of those people continue to drive innovation [at a variety of other companies]."

== Products ==
- Caldera OpenLinux, a Linux distribution with added non-free components
- UnixWare, a UNIX operating system. UnixWare 2.x and below were direct descendants of Unix System V Release 4.2 and was originally developed by AT&T, Univel, Novell and later on The Santa Cruz Operation. UnixWare 7 was sold as a UNIX OS combining UnixWare 2 and OpenServer 5 and was based on System V Release 5. UnixWare 7.1.2 was branded OpenUNIX 8, but later releases returned to the UnixWare 7.1.x name and version numbering.
- SCO OpenServer, another UNIX operating system, which was originally developed by The Santa Cruz Operation. SCO OpenServer 5 was a descendant of SCO UNIX, which is in turn a descendant of XENIX. OpenServer 6 is, in fact, an OpenServer compatibility environment running on a modern SVR5 based UNIX kernel.
- Smallfoot, technology consisting of an operating system and a toolkit to create point of sale applications
- Volution Manager, a browser-based systems administration solution
- Volution Online, a subscription-based service for testing and then updating Linux systems over a network
- Volution Messaging Server, a bundled mail and messaging solution for Linux and Unix servers
- Volution Authentication Server, technology to allow the management of Linux and Unix authentication via Microsoft servers
