= Caldera (company) =

Defunct American multinational operating system software company

Caldera, Inc.
- Industry: Software industry
- Founded: October 1994; 32 years ago
- Founder: Bryan Wayne Sparks; Ransom H. Love
- Defunct: 2002
- Fate: Folded Into SCO
- Successor: SCO
- Products: Caldera Network Desktop (CND); Caldera OpenLinux (COL); Caldera OpenDOS (COD); Caldera DR-DOS; Caldera DR-WebSpyder
- Subsidiaries: Caldera UK Ltd.; Caldera Deutschland GmbH; Caldera Taiwan; Caldera Systems, Inc.; Caldera Thin Clients, Inc.

Caldera, Inc. was a Canopy-funded software company founded in October 1994 and incorporated on 25 January 1995 by former Novell employees Bryan Wayne Sparks, Ransom H. Love and others to develop the Caldera Network Desktop (CND) and later create a Linux distribution named OpenLinux (COL). The company was originally based in Provo and later in Orem, Utah, USA.

== History ==
Their first product in 1995 was Caldera Network Desktop, which was based on Red Hat Linux and Novell's Corsair Internet Desktop. It also included LISA (Linux Installation and System Administration), which had been developed by the German Linux Support Team (LST) for their own Linux distribution.

The newer OpenLinux distribution was based on LST Power Linux, a Slackware-derived distribution that had been maintained by LST since 1993 and the first to come with a Linux 2.0 kernel.

Looking for a DOS operating system to bundle with their OpenLinux distribution, Caldera, backed up by The Canopy Group as their largest investor, acquired Novell DOS 7 and other Digital Research assets from Novell on 23 July 1996. The deal consisted of a direct payment of US$400000 as well as percentual royalties for any revenues derived from DR-DOS to Novell. Caldera filed the Caldera v. Microsoft antitrust lawsuit the same day. This lawsuit related to Caldera's claims of monopolization, illegal tying, exclusive dealing, and tortious interference by Microsoft. An example was that certain beta versions of Windows 3.1 produced technically groundless "non-fatal" fake error messages when installing and running them on DR DOS 6.0 due to a check known as AARD code in order to create fear, uncertainty and doubt (FUD) and destroy DR DOS' reputation. Another example was bundling and artificially tying MS-DOS 7 and Windows 4 into a single product (Windows 95) in order to eliminate competition. Caldera later demonstrated that it would have been beneficial for DOS and Windows users to have a choice between MS-DOS and DR-DOS feature-wise, and that it was technically possible to run Windows 4 on DR-DOS 7 simply by faking some new, unnecessarily complex but functionally non-essential internal interfaces through WinGlue. See Microsoft litigation#Caldera v Microsoft.

Since Digital Research's CP/M and MP/M had no commercial value for Caldera, they offered various binaries and sources for download on their site and allowed the redistribution and modification of more collected CP/M files through Tim Olmstead's independent "The Unofficial CP/M Web site" since 1997, for as long as they did not contain any DOS technology.

Caldera, Inc. supported the Linux-port of Star Division's StarOffice 3.1 with ca. DM 800000 in order to offer the product with their OpenLinux distribution in 1997.

== Subsidiaries ==
While active, Caldera, Inc. created a number of subsidiaries.

=== Caldera UK ===
Under the direction of Roger Alan Gross as General Manager of Caldera's Digital Research Systems Group (DSG) the UK-based development center Caldera UK Ltd. (51.20531°N 1.478786°W) was incorporated on 20 September 1996 to continue the development of the DR-DOS operating system in a converted barn (51.188306°N 1.487498°W) at the periphery of Andover, Hampshire, UK. Caldera UK developed various DOS-based products including OpenDOS 7.01 (COD), DR-DOS 7.02, DR-DOS 7.03 and DR-WebSpyder.

Caldera Thin Clients, Inc. closed the Caldera UK Ltd. development office in February 1999 soon after the release of DR-DOS 7.03, thereby effectively stopping any DOS development.

=== Caldera Deutschland ===
Caldera, Inc. incorporated the German Linux Support Team's (LST) configuration manager LISA into Caldera's Network Desktop in 1995.

In 1996 Linux Support Team grew into Stefan Probst's and Ralf Flaxa's company LST Software GmbH (with LST now standing for Linux System Technology) in Erlangen, Germany. This led to a collaboration with Caldera to develop OpenLinux.

LST Software became Caldera's German development center Caldera Deutschland GmbH for Linux-based technologies since May 1997.

Caldera Deutschland continued to develop Linux system software for Caldera's Linux-branch until it was closed at the end of 2001 by its US-based mother-house.

=== Caldera Taiwan ===
On 1 June 1998, Caldera, Inc. opened a sales office for its DOS-based products in Taipei, Taiwan, run by Irrana and Henry Huang.

== Caldera, Caldera Systems and Caldera Thin Clients ==
On 2 September 1998, Caldera, Inc. announced the creation of two Utah-based wholly owned subsidiaries, Caldera Systems, Inc. and Caldera Thin Clients, Inc., in order to split up tasks and directions.

Under Sparks' lead, the shell company Caldera, Inc. remained responsible for the Caldera v. Microsoft lawsuit. Microsoft lawyers tried repeatedly to have the case dismissed but without success. On 7 January 2000, immediately after the completion of the pre-trial deposition stage (where the parties list the evidence they intend to present), Microsoft settled out-of-court for an undisclosed sum, which in 2009 was revealed to be US$280000000. Caldera, Inc. ceased to exist soon after.

=== Caldera Systems, Caldera Holdings, Caldera International, Caldera K.K., and The SCO Group ===
Caldera Systems, Inc. (CSI), headed by Love as president and CEO since its incorporation in Orem, Utah, on 21 August 1998, targeted the Linux-based software business including OpenLinux, with Caldera Deutschland as their German Linux development center. The company reincorporated in Delaware on 2 March 2000 and completed an IPO of its common stock as CALD. On the first day of trading Caldera's shares doubled in value, briefly touching US$33, and by the end of the first day the company had a market capitalisation of US$1100000000. However, at a time when technology IPOs were attracting extremely high valuations, Caldera Systems's performance was generally perceived as a disappointment.

The company reorganized in August 2000 and became Caldera International, Inc. (CII) in March 2001.

In May 2001, Caldera International, with investments of Fujitsu and Hitachi, opened the Caldera K.K. (カルデラ株式会社) subsidiary, directed by Makoto Asoh, in Tokyo, Japan.

In August 2002, Caldera International renamed itself into The SCO Group, Inc. under the lead of Darl McBride.

=== Caldera UK, Caldera Thin Clients, Lineo, and Embedix ===
Caldera Thin Clients, Inc. (CTC), incorporated in August 1998 and originally led by Gross as president and CEO, instead developed DOS- and Linux-based thin clients and solutions for embedded systems. Originally located in Orem and later in Lindon, it was meant to become the US-based "parent" company for Caldera UK Ltd. When Gross resigned and Caldera UK Ltd. was disbanded in February 1999, and when the attempt to relocate the DR-DOS development into the US failed, Caldera Thin Clients, under the new lead of Sparks, soon refocused on Linux.

In April 1999, Caldera Thin Clients released the no longer needed sources to GEM and ViewMAX under the GNU General Public License (GPL).

On 20 July 1999, Caldera Thin Clients was renamed into Lineo, Inc. Lineo licensed a stripped down OpenLinux distribution from Caldera Systems and named it Embedix. They continued to maintain the former Caldera Thin Clients sales office in Taipei in 1999. In January 2000, Lineo reincorporated in Delaware.

In October 2001, Lineo refreshed and expanded the free CP/M redistribution license after Olmstead's death.

By July 2002, the company had reformed as Embedix, Inc. under the lead of Matthew R. Harris, formerly a Summit Law attorney for Caldera, Inc. Embedix ceased to exist later that year. Some DR-DOS assets fell to the Canopy Group and were acquired by DRDOS, Inc. aka DeviceLogics in 2002. Key parts of the Linux-based Embedix assets were acquired by Motorola's Metrowerks on 17 December 2002.

== See also ==
- Caldera OpenLinux
