= Caldera Smallfoot =

Embedded Linux distribution

Smallfoot was the name of both a rapid application development toolkit and an embedded operating system designed and released by Caldera Systems/Caldera International/The SCO Group in both UnixWare and Linux formats. Created for use in embedded environments such as point of sale systems and video gaming, the toolkits were intended to create specifically tailored operating systems geared towards the desired use. These customized and stripped down versions of the operating systems made less of a footprint, hence the names Smallfoot embedded UNIX and Smallfoot embedded Linux respectively.

Smallfoot is also notable in that it was a key Linux product of The SCO Group, developed for both the UNIX and Linux platforms and distributed by SCO and Caldera Systems/Caldera International after its purchase of SCO. In the SCO v. IBM lawsuit, SCO denied distribution of Linux kernel code, however SCO Smallfoot is based on both 2.4.10 and 2.6.1 Linux kernel versions.

== History ==
Smallfoot was first proposed in 2001. The name Smallfoot (whilst trademarked by SCO) was never the intended product's final name, but rather was a working name that stuck. A first prototype was built around the Linux platform. A deal was signed in January 2003 for Smallfoot to work on Beetle point-of-sale terminals from Wincor Nixdorf.

But given the SCO–Linux disputes that were underway a couple of months later, the Smallfoot Toolkit development switched to a Unix-based OS in May 2003.

The formatting of the toolkit configuration language drew heavily on Tcl. The toolkit included extensive configuration of many parts of the system, JavaPOS library, newly developed drivers for Point-of-Sale (POS) devices, and a POS application. A complete POS terminal developed with the Smallfoot Toolkit release 1.0 was demonstrated at SCO Forum in 2004 in Las Vegas, where breakout sessions entitled "Build a Smallfoot OS Using the Smallfoot Toolkit" and "Smallfoot is Not Just for Retail Anymore" were held. The further development, including a GUI, was shelved until the sales of the command-line version of the toolkit would pick up and provide a revenue stream.

The product itself was announced in June 2004, as part of a roadmap presented by SCO intended to show renewed investment in their Unix product lines. The Smallfoot Toolkit product went onto the SCO price list in July 2004. The minimal bundle was priced at approximately $35,000 and included the Toolkit, UnixWare license for the development machine running the toolkit, 500 deployment UnixWare licenses for the generated images, 10 hours of support. Larger volumes of the deployment licenses provided extra per-license discounts. None were ever sold and eventually the product was discontinued.

Eventually an outgrowth of Smallfoot found a customer, Budgens supermarkets. Budgens, a part of the Musgrave Group, were looking to implement Linux at their point of sale systems. The project became an early success story in terms of stores taking a chance on a Linux-based solution.

== See also ==
- Lineo Embedix
