= Lineo =

Embedded DOS and Linux company

- Lineo logo
- Industry: Computer software
- Founded: 20 July 1999; 27 years ago
- Headquarters: United States
- Key people: Roger Alan Gross, Bryan Wayne Sparks, Brad Walters
- Products: Embedix, DR-DOS
- Number of employees: 14 (1999); 50 (2000); 350 (ca. 2001)

Lineo was a thin client and embedded systems company spun out of Caldera Thin Clients by 20 July 1999.

== History ==
Caldera Thin Clients, Inc., had been created as a subsidiary of Caldera, Inc., on 2 September 1998. Caldera Thin Clients' original president and CEO was Roger Alan Gross, who resigned in January 1999. In April 1999, Caldera Thin Clients released the no longer needed sources to GEM and ViewMAX under the GNU General Public License (GPL).

In July 1999, Caldera Thin Clients decided on a major refocus on Linux and consequently changed its name to Lineo.

Lineo licensed a stripped down OpenLinux distribution from Caldera Systems and named it Embedix. They continued to maintain the former Caldera Thin Clients sales office in Taipei in 1999. In January 2000, Lineo reincorporated in Delaware.

Lineo's technologies fully owned were well ahead of competitors' products in the embedded system portion. These technologies included:

- Rt-Control provided μClinux - a version of Linux for microcontrollers, such as the Motorola 68k/ColdFire line, i960, ARM7, and ETRAX CRIS chips. With these chips lacking MMU and thus unable to provide multi-tasking capabilities, uClinux was able to run full-featured in as little as 150 KB of RAM with a 1 MB ROM chip.
- FirePlug - Linux-based projects, such as their Linux firewall built on the ThinLinux product, which ran in as little as 2 MB of disk/flash storage and 8 MB RAM.
- Embedix - Lineo's flagship product that ran a complete multitasking, networked Linux operating system in 2 MB of ROM/flash and 4 MB of RAM.
- Embedix SDK and the Embrowser - a fully graphical web browser for embedded systems. Embrowser was Lineo's port of the 32-bit Extended DOS-based browser DR-WebSpyder, originally based on the Arachne browser.

This combination of technologies allowed Caldera Thin Clients to offer a full Linux operating system with a graphical browser that could run off a floppy disk. More importantly the product was unique, and this came from the fact that Lineo's view on the Linux embedded market was different from other vendors. All the other vendors believed that Linux was heavily fragmented and that the solution was to offer Linux features for real time OSes, that is a Linux API for some other OSes. Red Hat with its EL/IX created a kernel independent framework (API) which allowed some Linux software to run on the eCos kernel. Lineo did not agree with this assessment and believed the API offered far more advantages and allowed for a fully hardened system, that is, Lineo utilized a custom Linux kernel. Through the six companies Lineo acquired, they were able to extend the same Linux technology across multiple chip architectures and add real-time capabilities. The acquisitions gave broader Linux support, from very small microcontrollers, through traditional platforms like x86, and up to high end, high availability systems.

Lineo's president and CEO, when it reformed under the new name, became Bryan Wayne Sparks, who also had been one of the original founders of Caldera, Inc., in 1994. At the time of its creation, Lineo had 14 employees.

Lineo's main product was Embedix, a lightweight Linux distribution for embedded systems, licensed from Caldera Systems, Inc., another subsidiary of Caldera, Inc.

Another product was DR-DOS, an MS-DOS–compatible disk operating system, previously developed by Caldera UK Ltd. between 1996 and 1999 and originally acquired from Novell by Caldera, Inc., on 23 July 1996.

Through its acquisitions Lineo also had a range of products in many different product categories.

Through a series of acquisitions and mergers, Lineo eventually ballooned to a peak of about 350 employees, with offices in seven countries. The companies that it acquired or merged with were:

- Zentropix – realtime Linux specialists
- Rt-Control Inc. – uClinux creators, very small board (uCdimm) vendors
- Moreton Bay – VPN/Router vendor (located in Brisbane, Australia)
- United Systems Engineering (USE) – Japanese Linux consulting company
- Fireplug – Canadian Linux consulting company (ThinLinux product)
- Inup – High availability Linux
- Embedded Power Corporation – Realtime and DSP OS (RTXC product)

== Decline ==
In October 2001, Lineo refreshed and expanded a free license for the redistribution and modification of original Digital Research binaries and sources related to CP/M and MP/M through "The Unofficial CP/M Web site" a license originally issued by Caldera in 1997.

After some assets were auctioned off in April 2002, by July 2002 the company had reformed as Embedix, Inc. under the lead of Matthew R. Harris, formerly a Summit Law attorney for Caldera, Inc. However, Embedix, Inc. was short-lived and ceased to exist later that year, when the Embedix division was purchased and absorbed by Motorola's Metrowerks.

The remaining Digital Research assets fell back to the investor Canopy Group, and parts of the DR-DOS sources were acquired by DeviceLogics in 2002.

Parts of the embedded modules and uClinux software assets (formerly Rt-Control Inc.) were acquired by Arcturus Networks Inc. in 2002.

The router division (formerly Moreton Bay) spun out as SnapGear, and was later acquired by CyberGuard and then Secure Computing, and Secure Computing was acquired by McAfee and as of 2008 was still producing the SnapGear brand of VPN/routers.

Lineo Japan, a former Japanese acquisition and at one time wholly owned subsidiary, United System Engineers, Inc. (USE), now trades as Lineo Solutions.

== See also ==
- Caldera Systems Smallfoot
- HP Jornada X25
