= Caldera OpenLinux =

Linux distribution of the late 1990s and early 2000s

- Installation CD from 1999
- Developer: Caldera, Caldera Systems, Caldera International
- OS family: Linux
- Working state: Defunct
- Source model: Mixed
- Initial release: 1997
- Latest release: 3.1.1 / 2002; 24 years ago
- Kernel type: Monolithic kernel
- License: Mixed

Caldera OpenLinux is a defunct Linux distribution produced by Caldera, Inc. (and its successors Caldera Systems and Caldera International) that existed from 1997 to 2002. Based on the German LST Power Linux distribution, OpenLinux was an early high-end "business-oriented" distribution that included features it developed, such as an easy-to-use, graphical installer and graphical and web-based system administration tools, as well as features from bundled proprietary software. In its era, Caldera OpenLinux was one of the four major commercial Linux distributions, the others being Red Hat Linux, Turbolinux, and SuSE Linux. (Note: Red Hat was the dominant commercial distribution at the time, with Caldera, SuSE, and Turbolinux in the next tier. Of two other distributions sometimes grouped with them, Mandrake Linux was aimed more at end users while Debian was for Linux enthusiasts.)

== Background ==
By 1994, under CEO Ray Noorda's purview, Novell Corsair was a project run by Novell's advanced technology group that sought to put together a desktop metaphor with Internet connectivity and toward that end conducted research on how to better and more easily integrate and manage network access for users. At the time, the Internet was dominated by Unix-based operating systems, but the Novell group saw the Unixes of the day as being too hardware intensive, too large, and charging too much in license fees. They became convinced that Linux offered the best possible answer for the operating system component, and started building code towards that purpose, including contributing work on IPX networking for NetWare and Wine compatibility layer for Windows. However, Noorda departed from Novell and under new management, the Linux role in Corsair was dropped.

Caldera, Inc. was founded in 1994 by Bryan Wayne Sparks and Ransom H. Love and received start-up funding from Noorda's Utah-focused Canopy Group, and Caldera became one of the first commercial companies putting out a Linux distribution. That first distribution was Caldera Network Desktop, which was based on Red Hat Commercial Linux. It seemed primarily aimed at the office desktop and custom solutions markets.

One of the features of Caldera Network Desktop was an installation component called LISA (Linux Installation and System Administration), which had been developed with the Germany-based Linux Support Team (LST). In terms of Linux distributions, that group was responsible for LST Power Linux, a Slackware-derived distribution that had been maintained by LST since its first incarnation in 1993. Caldera Network Desktop ended sales in March 1997.

== Technology and product ==
=== Caldera, Inc. era ===
Caldera, Inc. collaborated with the LST staff, which by then had become LST Software GmbH, and its LST Power Linux distribution, which was made the basis of their following product. Then in May 2007, it was announced at Linux Kongress that Caldera, Inc. was acquiring LST and its development center in Erlangen, Germany, thus creating Caldera Deutschland GmbH.

This new product was named Caldera OpenLinux. (The name OpenLinux tended to annoy people associated with other Linux distributions, falsely suggesting as it did that the other distributions were not open.) Review copies of it became available by March 1997. By one account, it was the first commercial distribution to include version 2 of the Linux kernel.

Caldera offered three versions of OpenLinux, with one for hackers and the other two for resellers and commercial users. Alternatively, the three versions could be seen as a base version, a workstation version, and a server version. Pricing could also change; at one point, the product breakdown was:

- OpenLinux Lite was a freely downloadable version.
- OpenLinux Base was a USD 99 version with a few extensions.
- OpenLinux Standard was USD 299 and was their fully featured product.

Earliest versions of OpenLinux came on CD-ROMs for installation, but it was often necessary to create floppy disks for the initial boot, depending upon the BIOS capabilities of the IBM PC compatible system being installed. That floppy was not shipped by the distribution and had to be cut by the user. At another point in time, Caldera OpenLinux was also available on a retail basis, in the form of a CD-ROM for installing Linux on a PC that sold for US$49.

OpenLinux typically came with a separate CD-ROM called the Solutions CD, which is what delivered the commercial software. These included such powerful enterprise products as the Adabas D database management system from Software AG. Use of these components required activation of a license key. A review in Computerwoche assessed the initial Caldera OpenLinux release as providing an easy-to-use distribution at an attractive price-to-performance point for those exploring Linux.

=== Caldera Systems era ===
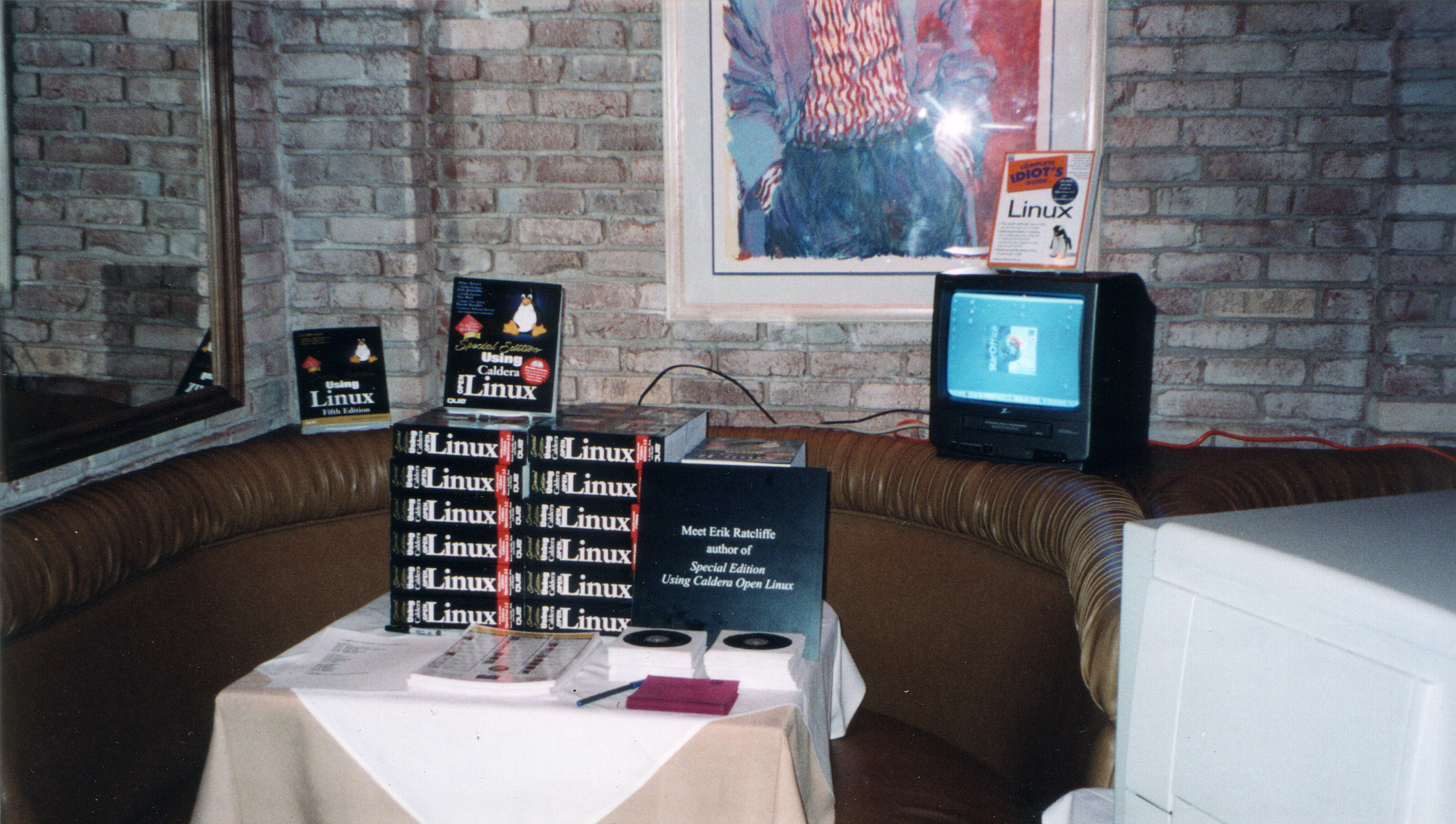
Book-signing event for Using Caldera OpenLinux, 1999

In September 1998, Caldera, Inc. spun off Caldera Systems, which handled OpenLinux going forward, including development, training, services, and support.

The Caldera Systems distribution used the KDE desktop. Other open-source components that it came with included Qt and Wine. There was also a non-commercial version of Star Office. Support for ISDN was bundled into the product, which was a benefit in the German market.

But Caldera Systems focused on a high-end Linux product and its Linux distribution became rich with features with bundled proprietary software. For instance, the company offered NetWare for Linux, which included a full-blown NetWare implementation from Novell. They licensed Sun Microsystems's Wabi to allow people to run Windows applications under Linux. Additionally, they shipped with Linux versions of WordPerfect from Corel as well as productivity applications from Applixware. Since many of their customers used a dual boot setup, Caldera shipped with PowerQuest's PartitionMagic to allow their customers to non-destructively repartition their hard disks.

This approach led to a debate about the purity of Linux-based products. Caldera stated that: "We have produced a product that combines the best of open-source and commercial packages; we are doing Linux for business. We do add to it commercial packages that allow business users to easily integrate it."

OpenLinux 2.2, released in April 1999, was seen as significantly improved from the previous year's 1.3 release, especially in terms of it having a fully graphical and easy-to-use installation feature. Ease of installation was an important criteria in selecting a Linux distribution, and Caldera Deutschland had created this first fully graphical installer for Linux, called Lizard, starting in November 1998. Several years later it was still receiving praise from reviewers. The installer could even be started from a Microsoft Windows partition.

The improvements provided by the Lizard installer led to the technology publication Linux Journal giving Caldera OpenLinux 2.3 its top award, Product of the Year.

=== Caldera International era ===
During 2000, Caldera Systems began the process of acquiring the Unix businesses of the Santa Cruz Operation. In March 2001 announced that it would be changing its name to Caldera International.

Caldera OpenLinux 3.1 came out in June 2001. Among the new softwares incorporated were Caldera's own Volution Manager and Volution Messaging Server, which were layers of functionality on top of Linux aimed at adding value to the operating system product. The workstation edition of Caldera OpenLinux came with a requirement for per-seat licensing. An extensive review of Caldera OpenLinux 3.1 in PC Magazine gave it 3 out of 5 'discs', behind the Red Hat and SuSE products which each got 4 out of 5.

The last release of the product was Caldera OpenLinux 3.1.1 in January 2002. OpenLinux 3.1 and 3.1.1 were used as the user-space basis for SCO's Linux Kernel Personality (LKP) product on SCO UnixWare.

== Markets, alliances, and sales ==
Caldera OpenLinux offered specific packages for e-commerce and secure-server configurations. It was also aimed at the business connectivity domain. As PC Magazine wrote at the time, "Unusual for the Linux world, Caldera makes a strong cost-of-ownership argument in the corporate environment." It also said: "Unparalleled support and a wide range of products, including e-commerce solutions, make Caldera OpenLinux Server 3.1 a very attractive choice. Caldera's clear distinction between client and server distributions underlines the company's endeavor to appeal to the business community."

In its era, Caldera OpenLinux was one of the four major commercial Linux distributions, the others being Red Hat Linux, Turbolinux, and SuSE Linux. In particular, these were the four that got the backing of hardware vendors such as HP and IBM.

By 2002, in the wake of the dot com bust, the Linux side of Caldera International was losing money badly; it was spending four times as much as it received in revenue. The only Linux distribution company that was doing even somewhat well at the time was Red Hat. Caldera International was further disadvantaged in that the Unix side of its business contributed most of its revenue and represented the products its resellers had the largest incentive to sell.

== End ==
United Linux was an attempt by a consortium of Linux companies to create a common base distribution for enterprise use and minimize duplication of engineering effort and thereby form an effective competitor to Red Hat. The founding members of United Linux were SuSE, Turbolinux, Conectiva, and Caldera International. The consortium was announced in May 2002. However, the UnitedLinux distribution would be based mostly SuSE Enterprise Linux rather than Caldera OpenLinux. As such, the Caldera product name was changed to "Caldera OpenLinux powered by United Linux". This effectively meant the end of the LST-/Caldera-based OpenLinux technology itself, and the Caldera Deutschland GmbH office in Erlangen was shut down.

In the event, United Linux did not last much longer. In June 2002, Caldera International had a change in management, with Darl McBride taking over as CEO from Ransom Love. Caldera International soon changed its name to The SCO Group. The product name Caldera OpenLinux became "SCO Linux powered by UnitedLinux". In May 2003, the SCO Group began issuing proclamations and lawsuits based upon its belief that its Unix intellectual property had been incorporated into Linux in an unlawful and uncompensated manner – thus commencing the SCO–Linux disputes – and stopped selling its own Linux product. The United Linux effort itself collapsed as a consequence.

== Known releases ==
- Caldera OpenLinux Lite/Base/Standard(/Deluxe) 1.0 (1997) with Linux kernel 2.0.25
- Caldera OpenLinux Lite/Base/Standard 1.1 (September 1997) with Linux kernel 2.0.29
- Caldera OpenLinux Lite/Base/Standard 1.2 (1998-04-17)
- Caldera Systems OpenLinux Lite/Base 1.3 (1998-09-28) with Linux kernel 2.0.35
- Caldera Systems OpenLinux 1.4? (there are some mentionings in the net, but in such a low number, that it is unclear, if this version was actually released ... and not sure if 2.0 and 2.1 existed at all)
- Caldera Systems OpenLinux 2.2 (1999-04-19) with Linux kernel 2.2.xx
- Caldera Systems OpenLinux eDesktop/eServer 2.3 (September 1999) with Linux kernel 2.2.10
- Caldera Systems OpenLinux eServer 2.3.1
- Caldera Systems OpenLinux eDesktop/eBuilder 2.4
- Caldera Systems OpenLinux eBuilder 3.0
- Caldera International OpenLinux Workstation/Server 3.1 (June 2001) with Linux kernel 2.4.2
- Caldera International OpenLinux Workstation/Server 3.1.1 (January 2002) with Linux kernel 2.4.13
