= SCO Forum =

Unix conference

- Status: Inactive
- Genre: Customer and partner technical conference
- Venue: University of California, Santa Cruz; MGM Grand, Mirage, Luxor
- Locations: Santa Cruz, California; Las Vegas, Nevada
- Country: United States
- Inaugurated: 1987
- Most recent: 2008
- Attendance: 3000 at peak (1997–1998)
- Organizer: The Santa Cruz Operation; Caldera International; The SCO Group

SCO Forum was a technical computer conference sponsored by the Santa Cruz Operation (SCO), briefly by Caldera International, and later The SCO Group that took place during the 1980s through 2000s. The SCO Forum conference was held annually, most often in August of each year, and typically lasted for less than a week. From 1987 through 2001 it was held in Santa Cruz, California, on the campus of the University of California, Santa Cruz. The scenic location, amongst redwood trees and overlooking Monterey Bay, was considered one of the major side draws of the conference. From 2002 through 2008 it was held in Las Vegas, Nevada, at one of several hotels on the Las Vegas Strip. Despite the name and location changes, the conference was considered to be the same entity, with both the company and attendees including all instances in their counts of how many ones they had been to.

During the keynote addresses for the Santa Cruz conferences, SCO would present its vision of the direction of the computer industry and how its products fit into that direction. There were then technical breakout sessions and "birds of a feather" discussions where SCO operating systems and other technologies were explained in detail and customers and partners could engage SCO engineers regarding them. Typically some 2000–3000 attendees came to each Forum. It was the largest tech event in the Santa Cruz area and made a multi-million dollar impact on the local economy.

During the Las Vegas years, Forum was used to convey the SCO Group's side in the SCO–Linux disputes. It was also used to showcase the company's efforts to revitalize its operating system business and to get into new business areas.

== SCO in Santa Cruz years ==
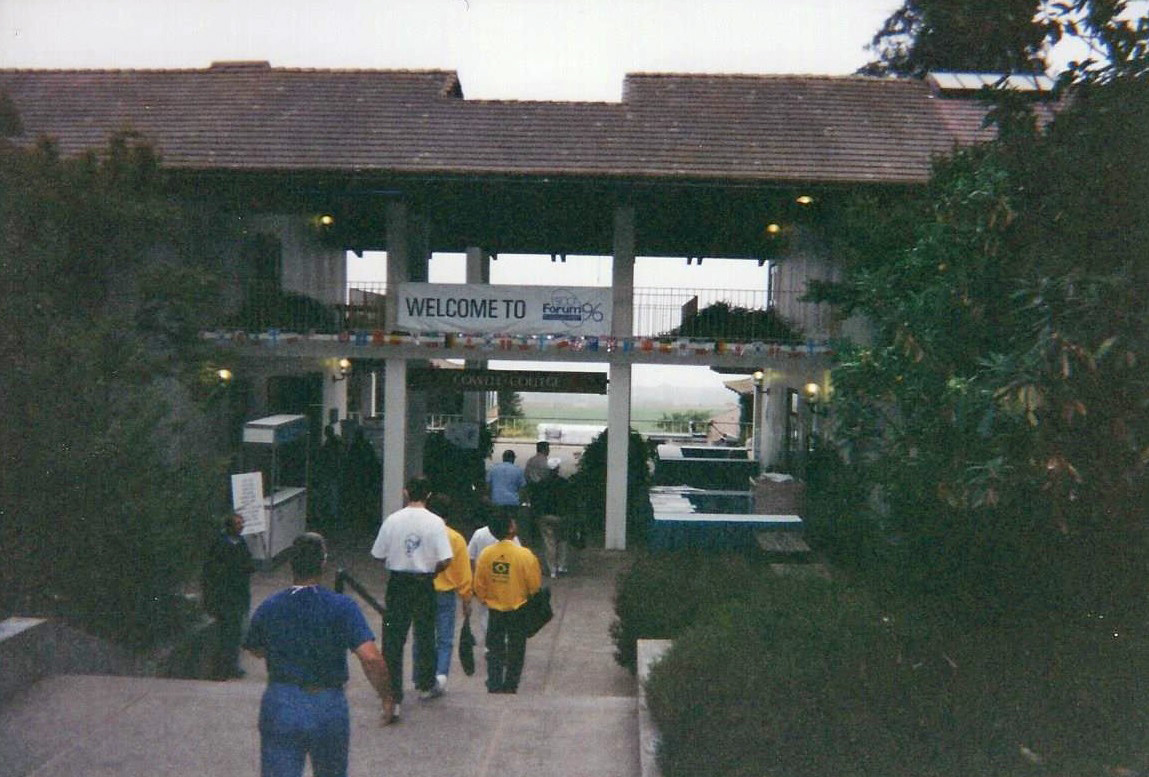
Welcome sign to SCO Forum96

=== Aims ===
The goal of SCO Forum was to spread the company's message and inform its users and partners as to the capabilities and technical characteristics of its products and express optimism about the future path of the company. Representatives from SCO included executives, product managers, development engineers, and others. Attendees from outside SCO included value-added resellers (VARs), channel distributors, application developers, and computer manufacturers.

Forum helped establish a community around SCO, where people reinforced each other in believing that using Unix as a basis for business solutions – by no means a given in those days – was the correct approach, and that SCO provided the right products from both a technical and business aspect to do so. As such, SCO Forum was considered a popular and very successful event. As Dr. Dobb's Journal later wrote, "SCO Forum was the place to be if you were a Unixhead."

With SCO having built a successful business with its Unix-on-commodity-hardware offering, Forum was used by the company to argue why new competitors in the space, such as Univel and SunSoft, would not be successful. In later years, when Unix itself came under threat, first from Microsoft's Windows NT and then from open source Linux, it was a role of Forum to stress that Unix was not going away and that business success could still be had with it. As SCO CEO Doug Michels said at Forum 1999, "In spite of all the rumors and opinions that Unix would end, it didn't."

New deals between SCO and other companies in the industry were often announced at Forum. Alternatively, panel discussions were held to discuss the state of already existing partnerships, such as one for Project Monterey, the strategic importance of which was given much attention at the time. Company slogans were advanced, such as "the Internet Way of Computing". On the other hand, failed initiatives announced at previous events, such as SCO's involvement in the Advanced Computing Environment (ACE), were explained away as quickly as possible.

=== History ===
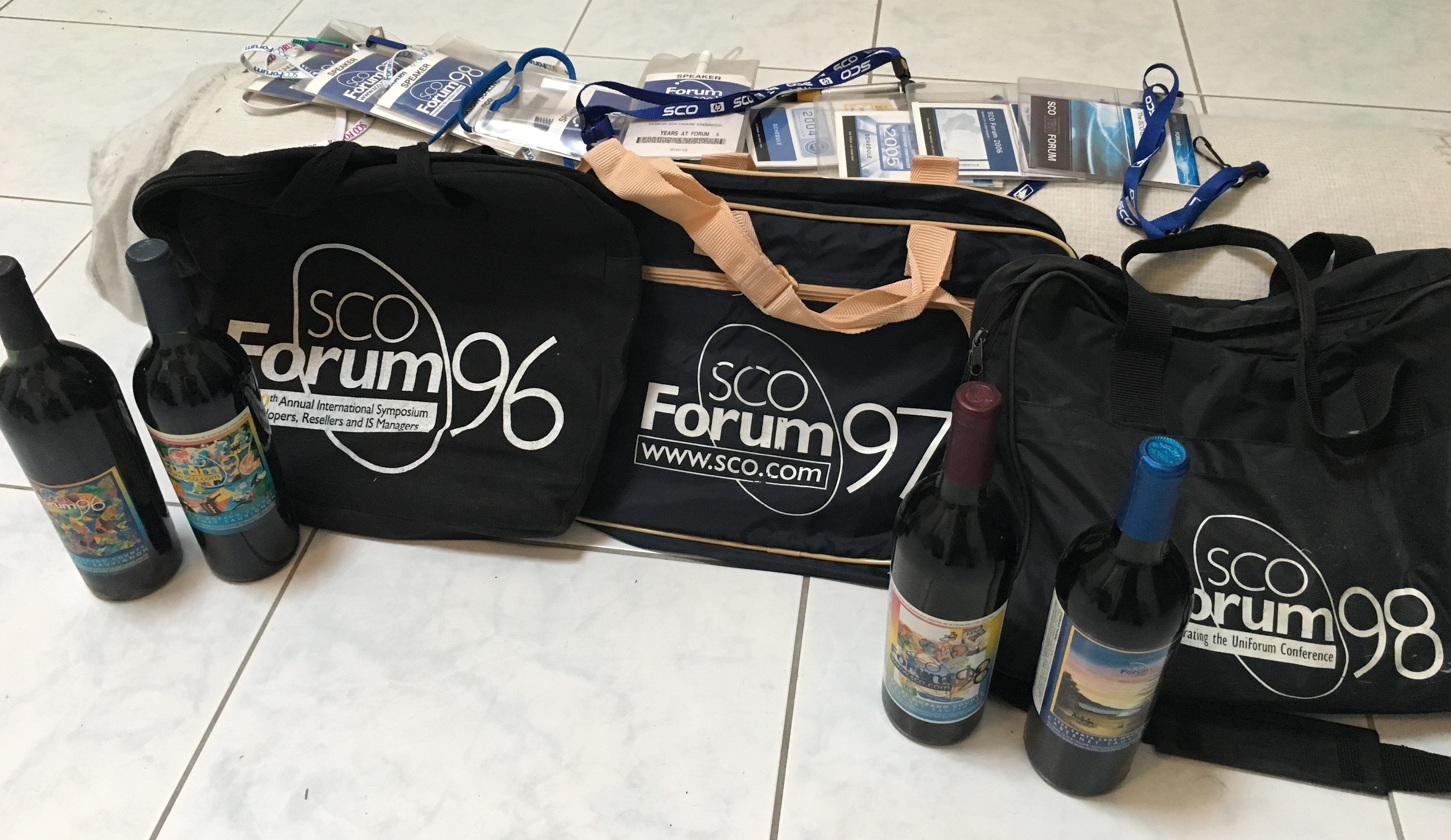
Badges, bags, and wine from over the years at SCO Forum

The first conference took place in 1987; it was referred to as the SCO XENIX 386 Developer Conference. SCO was looking for a place to hold an event that would bring together developers to exchange ideas, and the university said that it could provide such a spot in late August, before students returned to campus for the fall quarter.

By August 1988, the trade publication InfoWorld was mentioning "SCO Forum '88, a conference for Xenix developers." However, unlike the previous years' Forum, this one was not restricted to developers, with resellers invited as well as part of SCO's effort to build a strong reseller base. The conference featured an announcement from SCO partner AT&T about a merged Unix and Xenix OS product.

SCO Forum '89 was also reported on in InfoWorld as well as in PC Week. It was held during August 21–25, as was promoted ahead of time by Newsbytes News Network. It featured third-party vendors announcing new releases of their products. In particular, an agreement with Microsoft to support Word and related products on SCO systems was highlighted. Speakers at Forum '89 included Paul Maritz of Microsoft and Ray Noorda of Novell as well as the company's two founders, Larry Michels and Doug Michels.

Both the company and the conference underwent growth. SCO held other technical and marketing events and seminars during the year and around the world, but Forum was certainly the largest of them. Advertisements for Forum stressed the value attending it would hold for a wide range of industry people – executives, managers, hardware developers, software developers, resellers, distributors, dealers, third-party vendors, and end users, as well as journalists and industry analysts, with session tracks available for each of these audiences.

With the company showing some profitable quarters, anticipating going public, and holding a roughly 75 percent share in the small-to-medium-sized businesses market, SCO Forum92 saw 2500 people in attendance, a big jump of about twice the previous year's total. From a third to a half of the attendees were from overseas, reflecting the company's worldwide success. Among these were about thirty attendees from formerly communist Eastern Bloc states.

Advertisements for Forum93 tried to give the conference an almost academic flavor, billing as it an "International Open Systems Symposium", making reference to the open systems movement then popular. Courses were said to be available in certain "majors" and upon completion would result in the attendee earning a certificate of completion from SCO. But the tenor of the week was set by SCO chief executive Lars Turndal's opening keynote address, where he attempted to soothe anxieties related to the company's past year of management shakeups and poor stock performance.

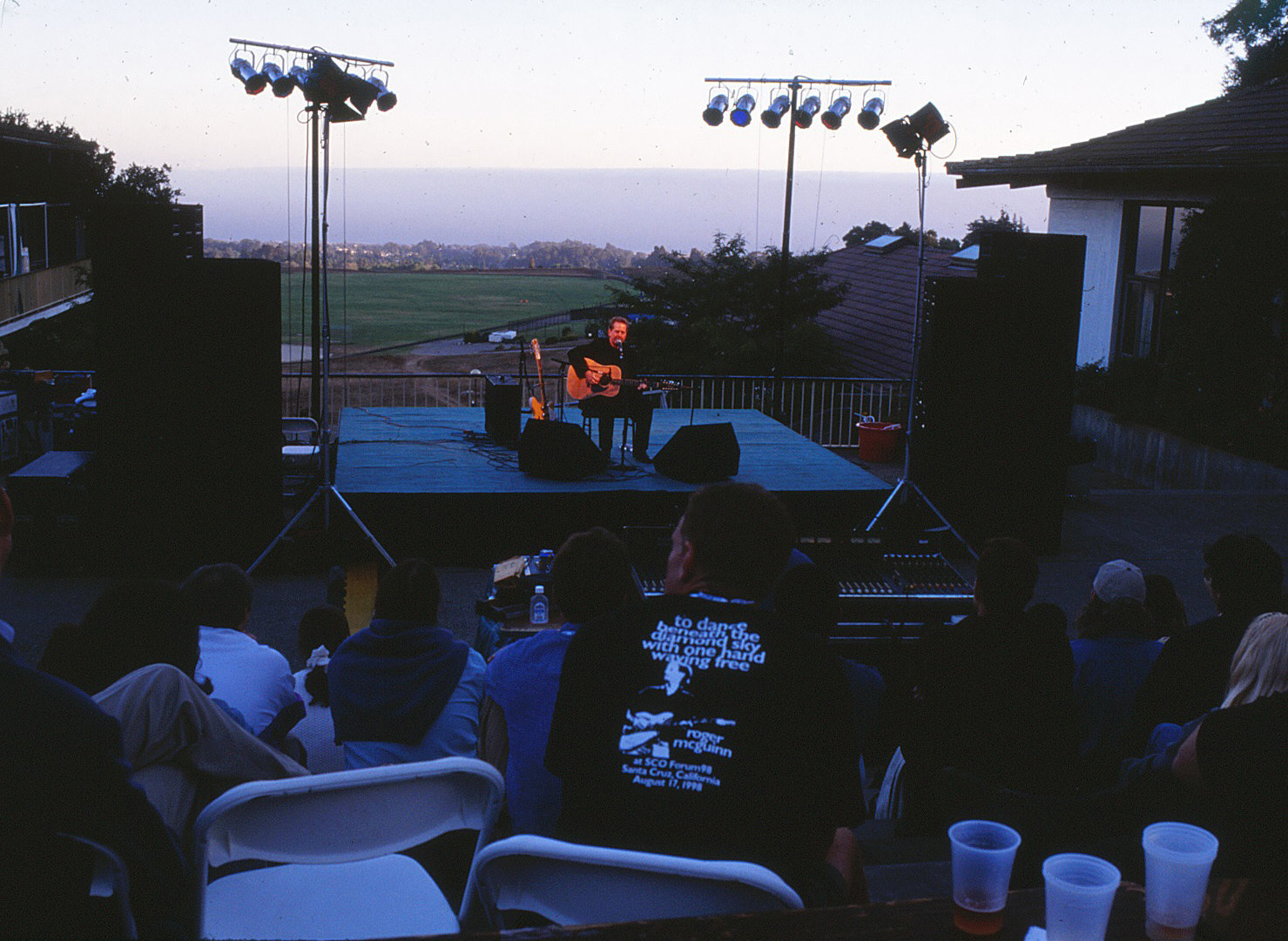
Timeless music, timeless setting: Roger McGuinn performing an evening concert on the patio of Cowell College at SCO Forum98, with Monterey Bay in the background

By 1994, Forum was on UNIX Review's recommended list of shows and conferences for readers to attend, and in a survey of events they characterized it as one of "the industry's leading-edge trade shows".

An increase in technically-oriented, future-focused content was noted for Forum94. Forum94 had one of the more celebrated demonstrations, that of SCO's back-end role in the creation of PizzaNet, which enabled computer users for the first time to order pizza delivery from their local Pizza Hut restaurant via the Internet. That year's conference also witnessed what is said to have been the first-ever scheduled live music concert to be broadcast across the Internet, in an August 23 performance by local band Deth Specula on the Mbone.

SCO had been an original co-sponsor of the UniForum association of Unix users and had long had a close relationship with it. By 1996 attendees to Forum were given a trial membership in UniForum. And by Forum98 there was an explicit UniForum track of breakout sessions available. In some cases gatherings at Forum led to industry initiatives taking place, such as the 86open effort to form consensus on a common binary file format for x86-based Unix and Unix-like operating systems, which had its initial meeting at SCO's Santa Cruz offices on the final day of Forum97.

Peak Forum attendance was in 1997 and 1998, when about 3000 people attended each event. Some 60 different countries were represented.

Forum attendees by company type, late 1990s
Software developer	27%
Distributor	22%
SCO reseller	17%
Computer manufacturer	15%
Hardware developer	12%
Systems integrator	3%
Trainer	3%
Internet service provider	1%

Forum often featured individuals and groups who came year after year, viewing it as something of an annual pilgrimage and reunion. One such group was of developers and resellers in the United States who qualified for the SCO Advanced Product Center (APC) designation. After first getting together at a "birds of a feather" session at Forum in 1989, they formed an association known as APC Open in 1990, that was renamed to APC International in 1998 and iXorg in 2000. Another such attendee was Dupaco, the founder of which attended every Forum from the beginning and built a multi-million dollar business with SCO Xenix and later products while becoming the sole distributor of SCO products in the Netherlands.

Many writers considered SCO Forum to be unique in the industry. As a Dataquest columnist said, "It was a veritable treat. Set amidst the verdant redwood trees at the ... (UCSC) campus, it was a Unix feast that lasted for five Californian summer days." An industry observer for eWeek recalled that both Forum and the company Santa Cruz Operation itself had "reflected the ethos of the community for which it was named" and that "based in the college/beach town of Santa Cruz, Calif., epitomized an industry culture [soon to be] gone." And as one ZDNet writer stated, "SCO Forum ... is like no conference or industry confab you'll ever attend. Part pep rally, part study session, part sales pitch, and part schmoozefest, Forum has a far different atmosphere than any conventional trade show."

=== Structure ===
The conference was sometimes arranged through the Jack Baskin School of Engineering of UC Santa Cruz and typically used classrooms, dining facilities, recreational areas, parking lots, and campus housing, most often at Cowell College and Stevenson College. In one year a dean at UC Santa Cruz sent a memorandum to the campus community stating:

"I know that this conference occupies numerous UCSC facilities and may create confusion about where to park and eat. For some, the noise created by the presence of the conference participants will impact their work environment. However, this event provides many benefits for our campus community, and I hope that you are able to make accommodations in order to minimize the effects of the forum".

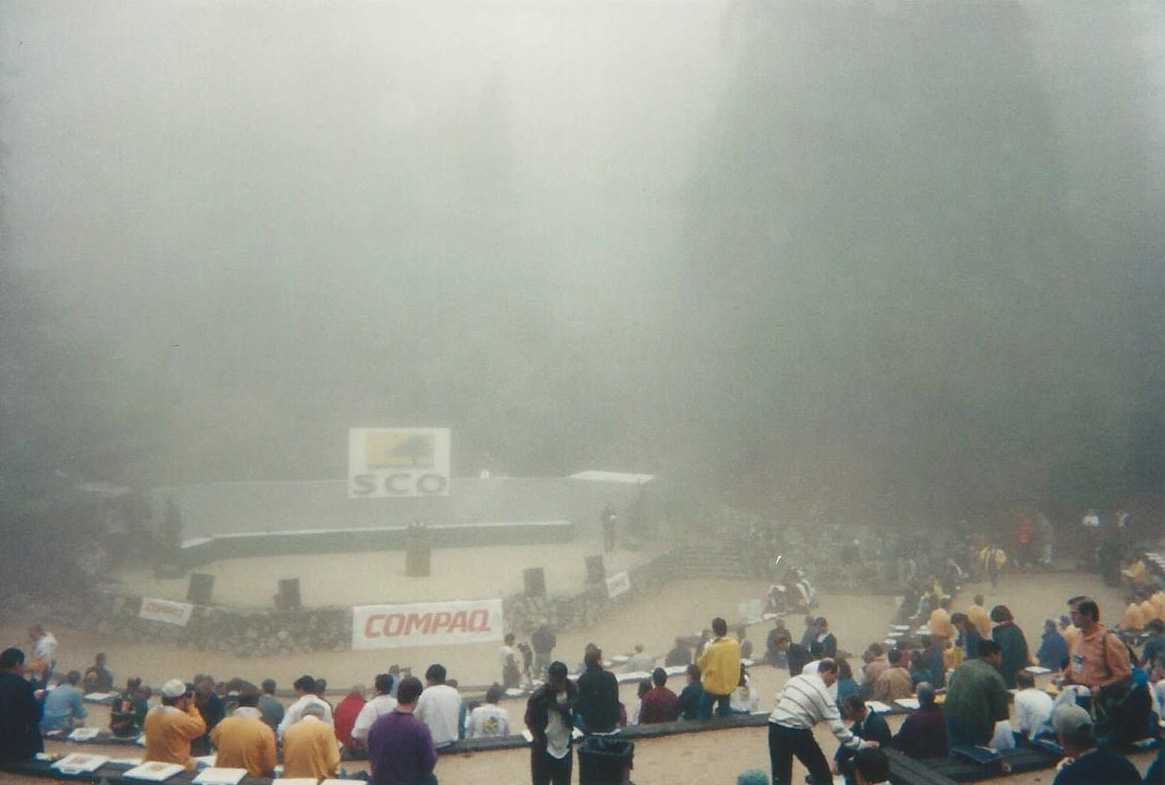
Attending morning keynote addresses in the fog-shrouded quarry amphitheater was a common occurrence (here in 1997)

Keynote addresses were held each morning in the university quarry, an open-air amphitheater nestled within coastal redwoods. Upwards of 1500 attendees would come to these sessions. Doug Michels saw the quarry as an advantage over the dark hotel ballrooms where most conferences presented their over-produced keynote addresses, saying, "It's impossible to give a slide show in the Quarry." Due to the sharp diurnal temperature fluctuations characteristic of the Santa Cruz Mountains, the quarry was often fog-enshrouded and chilly in the morning, but attendees were advised to dress in layers that could be shed later as the fog burned off and the sun shone over Monterey Bay. The quarry had plain wood bleachers for which cushions were provided to sit on. (For Forum 1999 only, which had a decline in attendance from the peak, keynotes were moved to a location on the campus's East Field, where a stage and seating area were constructed. It was cold and foggy there in the morning too, but as CNN reported, that "couldn't dampen the spirits of Unix enthusiasts" in attendance.)

Keynote addresses came not just from SCO executives but from major figures in the industry, including Andy Grove, CEO of Intel, as well as from various executives of partner companies. Technology observers would also debate such matters as, in SCO Forum 95, the nature of the much-ballyhooed "information superhighway", with writer Clifford Stoll and Electronic Frontier Foundation founder and Grateful Dead lyricist John Perry Barlow reaching divergent conclusions. A third participant, one that was ironic in light of later developments, was Linus Torvalds, who offered his own view of things. Predictions made during Forum keynotes were not always accurate; Torvalds himself said that Linux made a more reliable desktop than Microsoft and that "if Unix decides to ignore the desktop market and tries to be a server, even if it's a server that tries to serve desktops, Unix is eventually going to die. And I think the future is acknowledging that the desktop market is where it's at."

Even business rivals were sometimes represented, with Sun Microsystems CEO Scott McNealy – who was also in the Unix-on-Intel space – speaking at Forum in 1996. McNealy pointed out some areas of common interest in the process of giving what ZDNet recalled several years later as "an extremely entertaining speech".

In addition, guest speakers often included humorists of one kind or another, including such figures as Dilbert cartoonist Scott Adams, who one reporter said "enthralled" the crowd. Another such speaker was author Dave Barry.

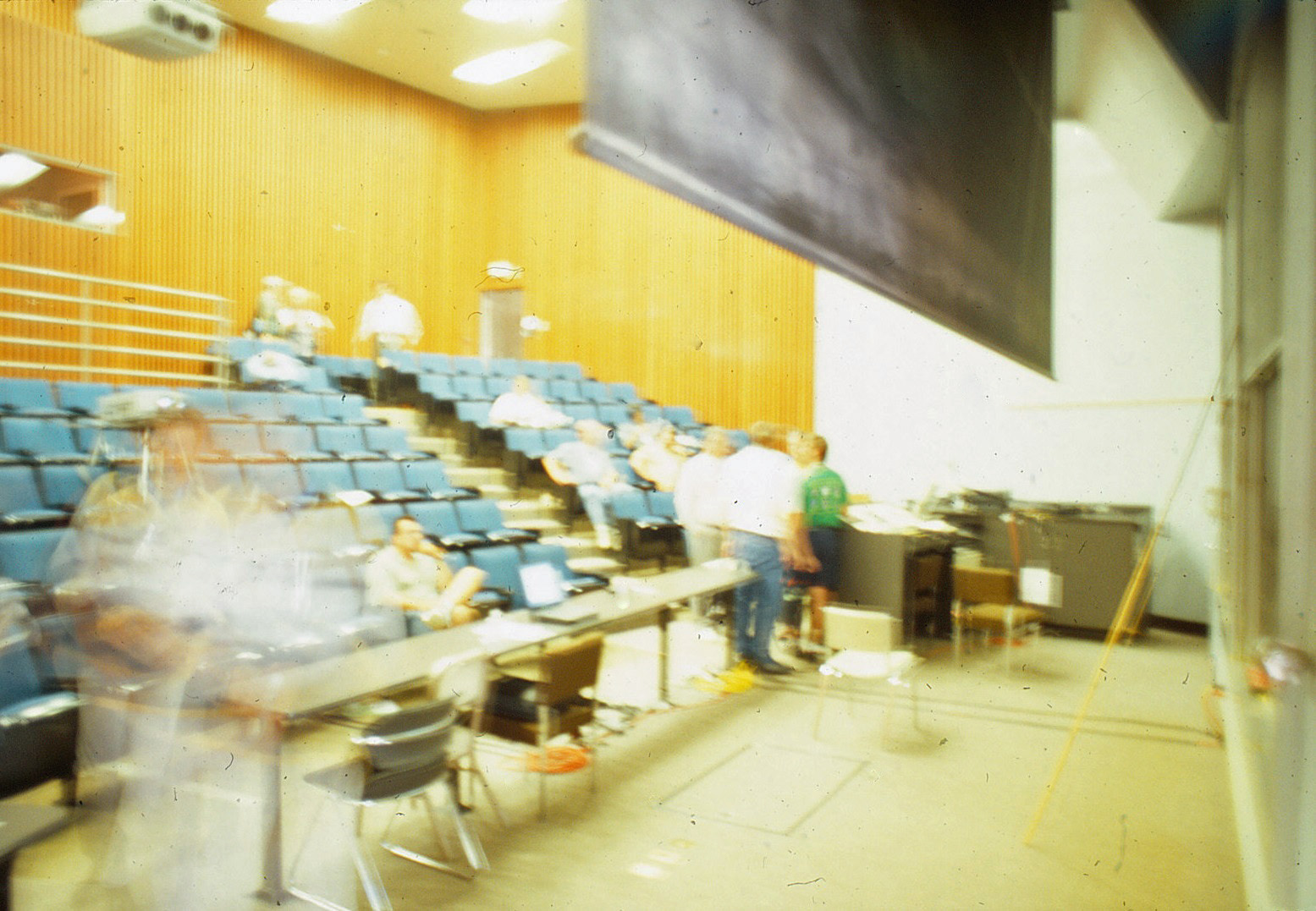
Between breakout sessions of Developer Fast Track during SCO Forum98

There were a hundred or more hardware and software exhibitors at the conference, who would set up labs and demonstrations in college halls. These companies included major systems vendors such as IBM, Compaq Computer and NEC. SCO set up pavilions to demonstrate various advances in networking and client-server computing. The general public was invited to attend the keynote addresses and visit the exhibits and pavilions, after paying a relatively small entrance fee.

Forum attendees by job function, late 1990s
Sales/Marketing	35%
Engineering/IT admin	23%
Executive management	21%
Technical management	14%
Press/Analysts	7%

Breakout sessions took place during the late morning and in the afternoon after lunch, and were devoted to the most detailed level explanations of SCO products, with tracks devoted towards both technical and marketing audiences. Sample session names included "Tuning and Monitoring Your SCO Internet Server", "Rejuvenate Character Applications with SCO TermVision", and "Retail Business Opportunities II: Over the Counter Profits". In addition, the years 1996 through 1999 saw Thursday and Friday added on for a supplemental "Developer Fast Track" program; these sessions covered hard-core topics such as "DDC 8 Tutorial and Driver Walk-Through", "JDK 1.2 – Benefits for Application Programmers", and "Porting Applications to IPv6". In the evenings after dinner, "birds of a feather" sessions were held in a number of classrooms and other locations, allowing attendees even more direct contact with SCO product managers and development engineers. The SCO Skunkware collection of open source built and packaged for SCO operating systems was an example of something that was spread through birds of a feather sessions at multiple Forums.

Forum made a large, positive economic impact on the town of Santa Cruz, the university, and surrounding Santa Cruz County. In the mid-late 1990s this benefit was estimated at $3–4 million. Indeed, the mayor of Santa Cruz would sometimes label the week as "SCO Forum Week" or open the conference on Monday morning, and it was a largest tech industry gathering of any kind in the county. Hotels and motels in the area would be booked for the week. Some attendees were put up in campus rooms and apartments, a tradition dating back to the early years of Forum when typical SCO developers could not afford anything more.

Resellers who performed the best during the year were rewarded by getting their travel expenses to Forum paid for. The age of attendees was older than usual for technology conferences, with many VARs having well-established businesses. In addition, more women were present at Forum than were typically seen at technology conferences, which one writer partly attributed to the more mature nature of the SCO reseller base.

=== Fun ===
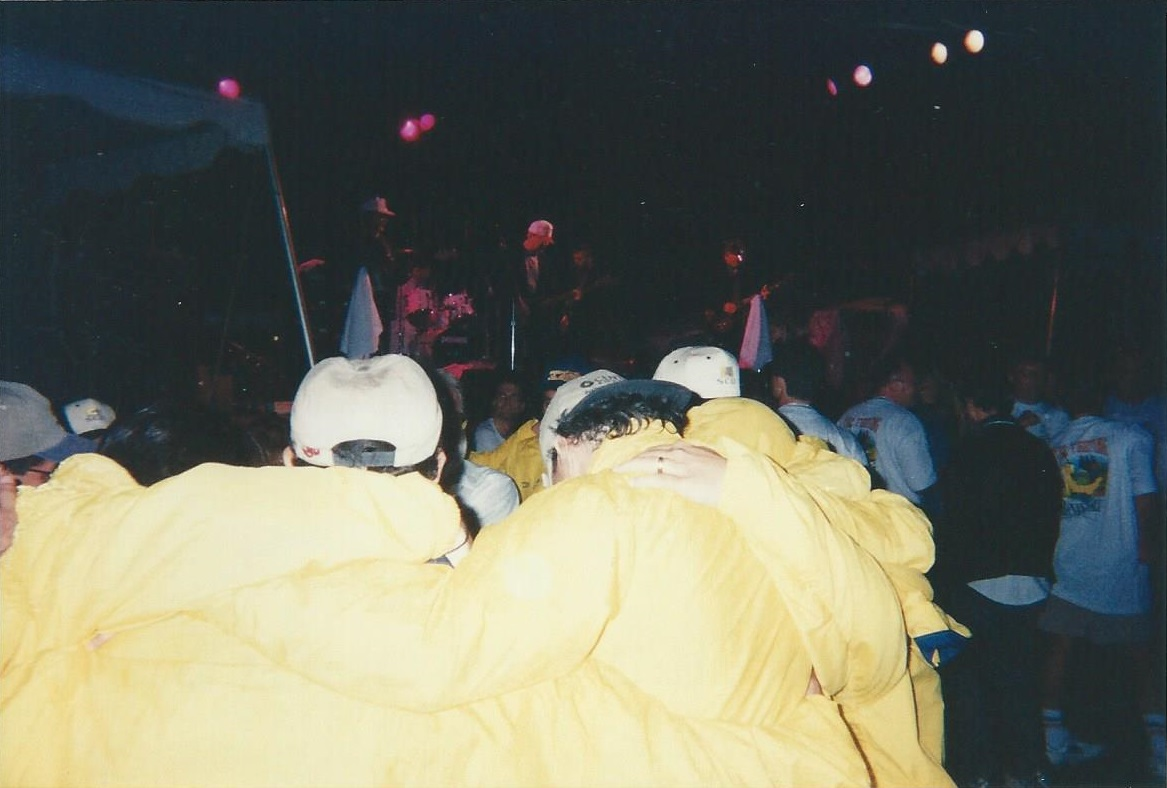
An enthusiastic group of overseas attendees at the Tuesday night barbecue and party, as The Kingsmen play on stage in 1997

As one Linux Journal piece noted, "SCO Forum [is] famous for its fun, casual environment." UNIX Review mentioned Forum as being associated with "the usual Santa Cruzian gaiety". Indeed, the 'having a fun experience' aspect was something that the company's two founders, Larry Michels and Doug Michels, both emphasized. The environment and the dress code were both casual (although some vendor representatives did not always get the message at first). One first-time attendee termed the week a "romp in the redwoods". Even finding one's way around could be considered enjoyable, as one attendee later recalled: "Had you ever been to one of [the company's] shindigs at the University of Santa Cruz? It was called the SCO Forum and by the fourth day ... you've finally remembered, which giant redwood to go left at and which sandy cliff you should climb to make it back to your dorm."

Side activities at Forum often included a golf tournament, a soccer tournament with international teams, a fun run, beach volleyball, wine tastings in the nearby mountains, and rides on the Santa Cruz, Big Trees and Pacific Railway or Roaring Camp & Big Trees Narrow Gauge Railroad to a barbecue and the spectacular Henry Cowell Redwoods State Park.

Parties were frequent at Forum and local catering companies did quite well. A large contingent of Forum attendees from Latin America made their presence felt in this respect. Parties were also sometimes held off-campus, such as at the Santa Cruz Beach Boardwalk. The existence of official SCO Forum bottles of wine gave further credence to this aspect of the conference.

Typically SCO hosted a Barbecue and Anniversary Celebration on the Tuesday night of Forum, with a band that played until 11 pm, after which some attendees carried on in what, as the conference guide said, was "a social event that has become legendary in the computer industry." Many other relaxations took place as well. Name musical acts featured at SCO Forum, for the Tuesday night party and in other time slots, included Tower of Power, The Kingsmen, The Surfaris, Jan and Dean, Jefferson Starship, and appearances over three consecutive years from folk-rock legend Roger McGuinn. Local bands that performed for the Tuesday night party included Big Bang Beat and Dick Bright's SRO.

== Caldera interlude ==
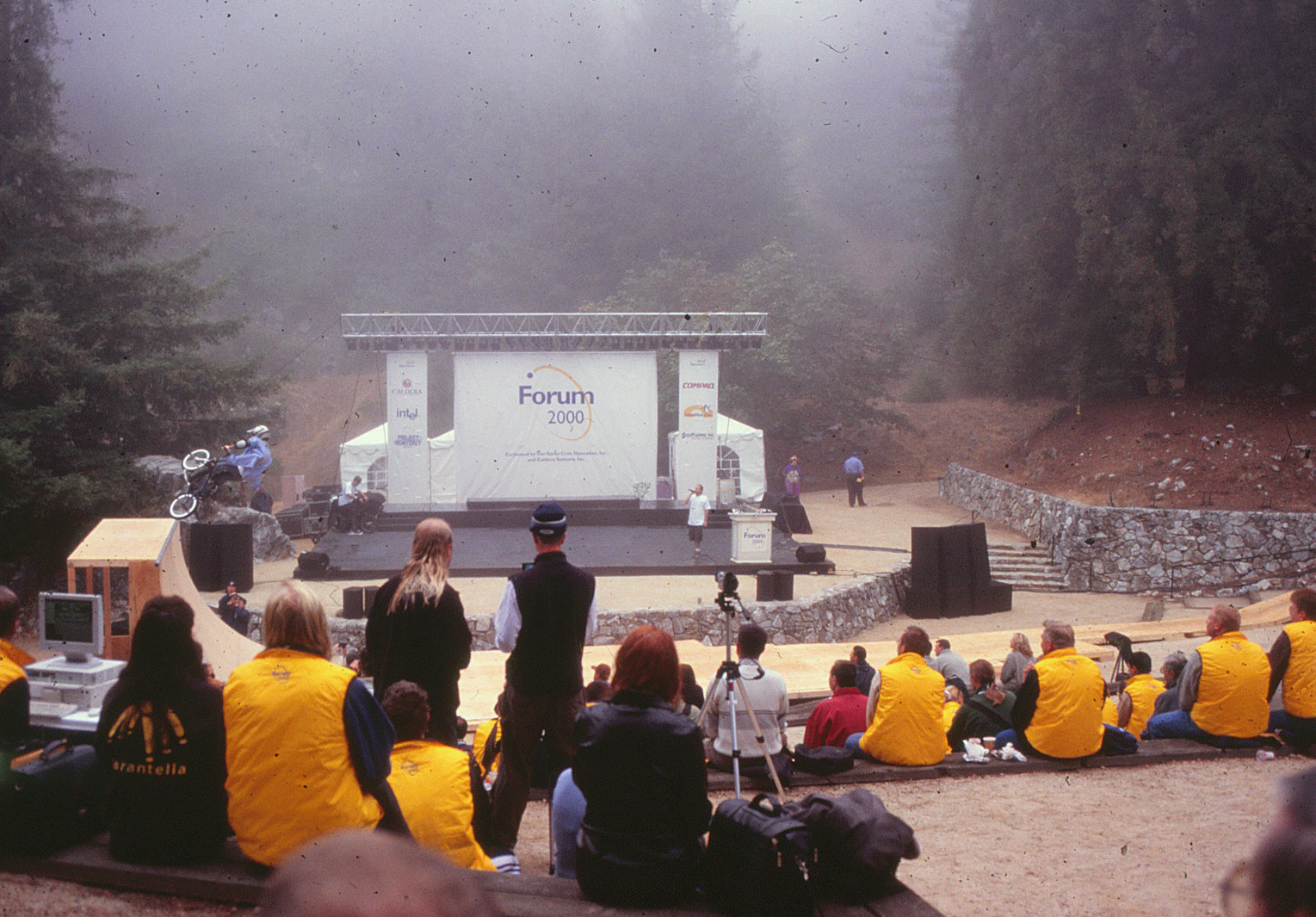
BMX exhibition put on during the keynote sessions of Forum 2000 – with "SCO" removed from the conference name due to the pending acquisition by Caldera Systems

On August 2, 2000, following several months of negotiations, Santa Cruz Operation announced that it would sell its Server Software and Services Divisions to Caldera Systems. The sale came after a series of good financial results had gone sour for SCO as 1999 turned into 2000. As a result, the conference held later that month was called not SCO Forum 2000 but just Forum 2000. Both Doug Michels and Ransom Love, CEO of Caldera Systems, gave keynote addresses.

By August 2001, Caldera International, the name of the merged company, was suffering both from the effects of the dot-com bust and from a lengthy and difficult acquisition process of SCO that had alienated some longtime SCO customers and partners. Now for the first time, Forum was explicitly held under the Caldera name. Caldera CEO Ransom Love said he hoped that the event would do even better than before and that he admired the history of the event: "It is unique in the industry because it is not a trade show and people do not go there to be sold something; they go to interact. There are far too few events like that."

Nevertheless, attendance at Caldera Forum 2001 was less than half that of the previous year. Love said at the event, "you have to get through the storm to get through to the beautiful day."

== SCO Group in Vegas years ==
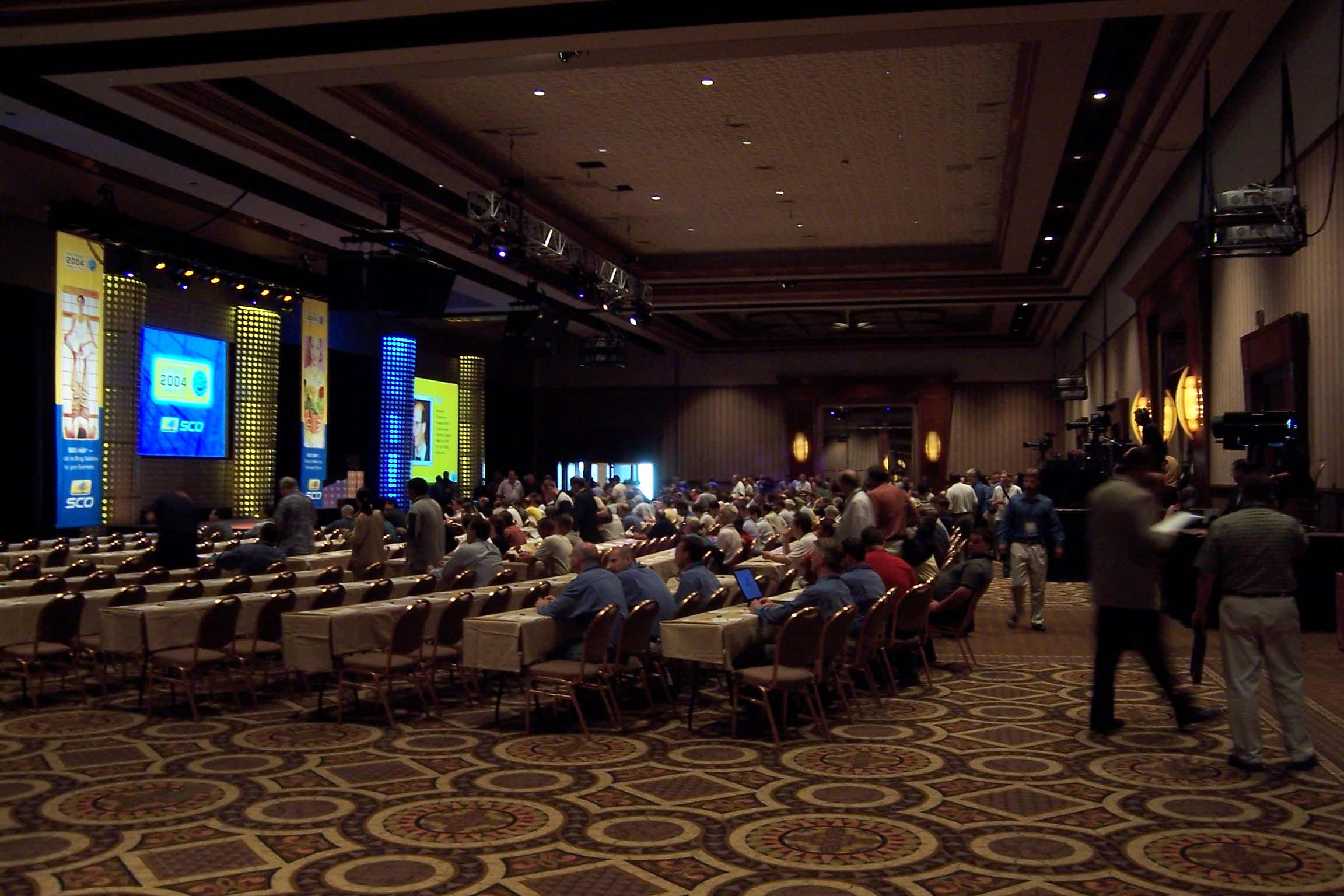
Keynotes in Las Vegas were indoors, here in 2004 at the MGM Grand

Caldera International continued to encounter significant financial struggles, made worse by the effects of the early 2000s recession. As a cost-saving measure, in May 2002 the company indicated that the world-wide Forum conference in Santa Cruz would be dropped; instead, there would be smaller events around the world, including one at a different location in the United States. In June 2002, Caldera International changed management, with Darl McBride taking over as CEO from Ransom Love.

In July 2002 the annual Forum conference was renamed for that year to Caldera GeoFORUM, and its location was moved to an environment that could not have been more different from the redwoods of Santa Cruz – the Las Vegas Strip, at the MGM Grand.

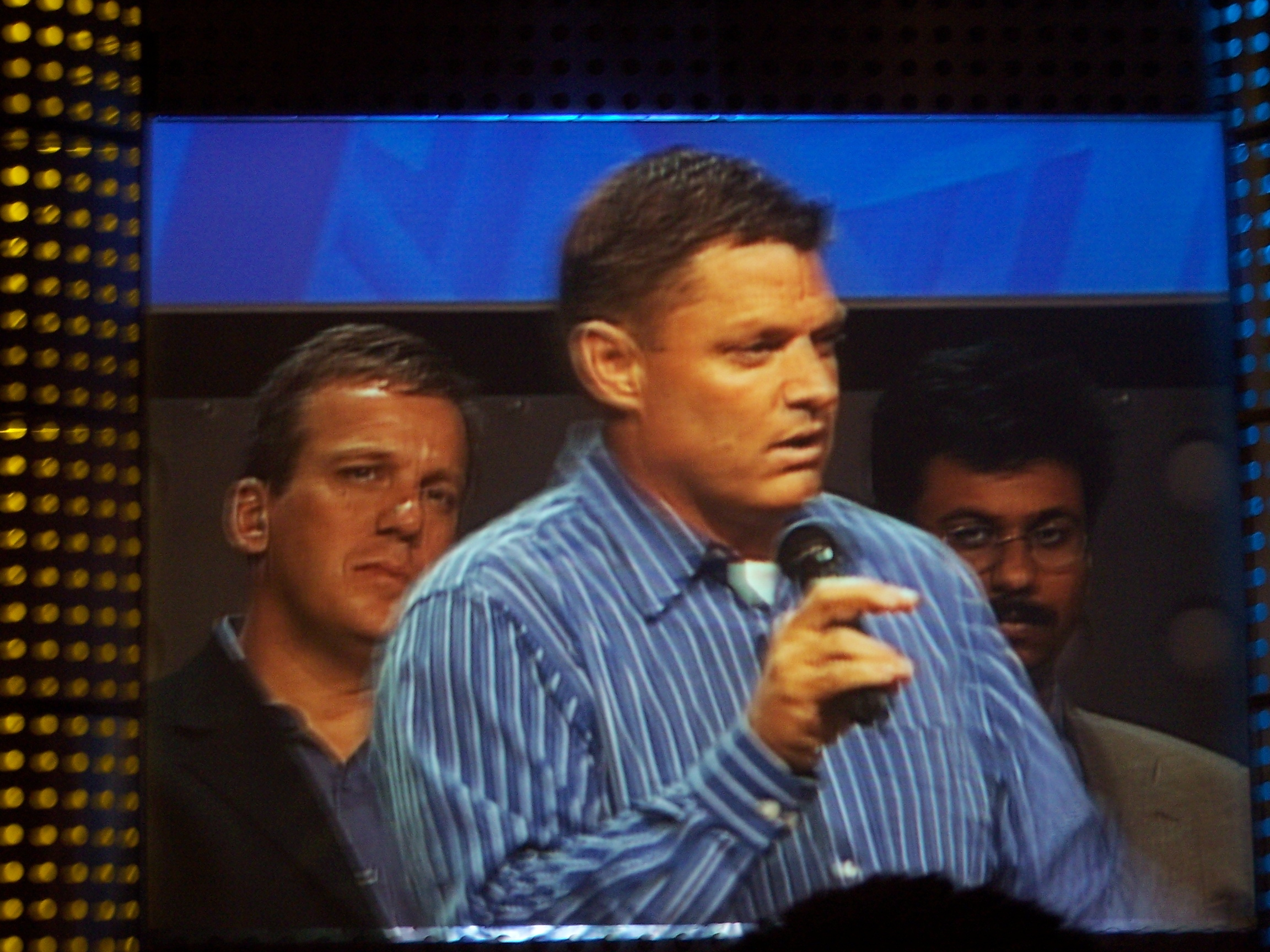
Much of the attention of Vegas Forums was on what SCO Group CEO Darl McBride (center) had to say about the company's battles with the Linux world

Then during the opening keynote address of the conference, on August 26, 2002, it was announced that Caldera was changing its name back to SCO, in the form of the new name The SCO Group. This reflected recognition of the reality that almost all of the company's revenue was coming from SCO Unix, not the Linux products that had come from Caldera, and that resellers were not making the switch to Linux. McBride made the announcement in flashy style; as Linux Journal described, "Using a high-tech multimedia show, the Caldera image was shattered into shards by the new SCO Group logo, which is pretty much the same as the old SCO logo." The announcement was met with a standing ovation from the Forum audience, almost all of whom were longtime SCO resellers. (Some former employees of the Santa Cruz Operation, however, grew to resent the rebirth of the SCO name and said that "it was no longer our SCO." Some industry observers expressed the same lament.) Some new initiatives were announced, such as the SCObiz collaboration with Vista.com, where that company's CEO John Wall gave a keynote showing how SCObiz would give a Web-based e-commerce capability to older SCO-based applications in the small-to-medium-business segment.

By the time of the Las Vegas Forum 2003 rolled around, McBride had led the SCO Group in a very different direction, issuing proclamations and lawsuits based upon a belief that SCO Unix intellectual property had been incorporated into Linux in an unlawful and uncompensated manor, and halting sales of the company's own Linux product. The SCO–Linux disputes were fully underway and the SCO Group was mired in controversy. eWeek magazine reported that in response to pressure from the open source community and Linux vendors, Intel withdrew its sponsorship of Forum 2003 and HP decided not to give a partner keynote address. Nonetheless, HP did sponsor the welcome reception at the hotel, which eWeek said was well attended.

During the opening keynote, held on August 17, 2003, and accompanied by James Bond music (Vegas Forums tended to use Hollywood or Vegas motifs in their opening sessions), McBride, vice president Chris Sontag, and a representative from law firm Boies Schiller showed what they said were clear examples of SCOs protected Unix code being found in Linux. Despite the prominence of the legal situation, there was also emphasis at this Forum on SCO products and their roadmaps for further development and features.

SCO continued to be the subject of intensely hostile feelings from the open source and Linux community, with the Groklaw website leading the way. SCO would soon become, as Businessweek headlined, "The Most Hated Company In Tech".

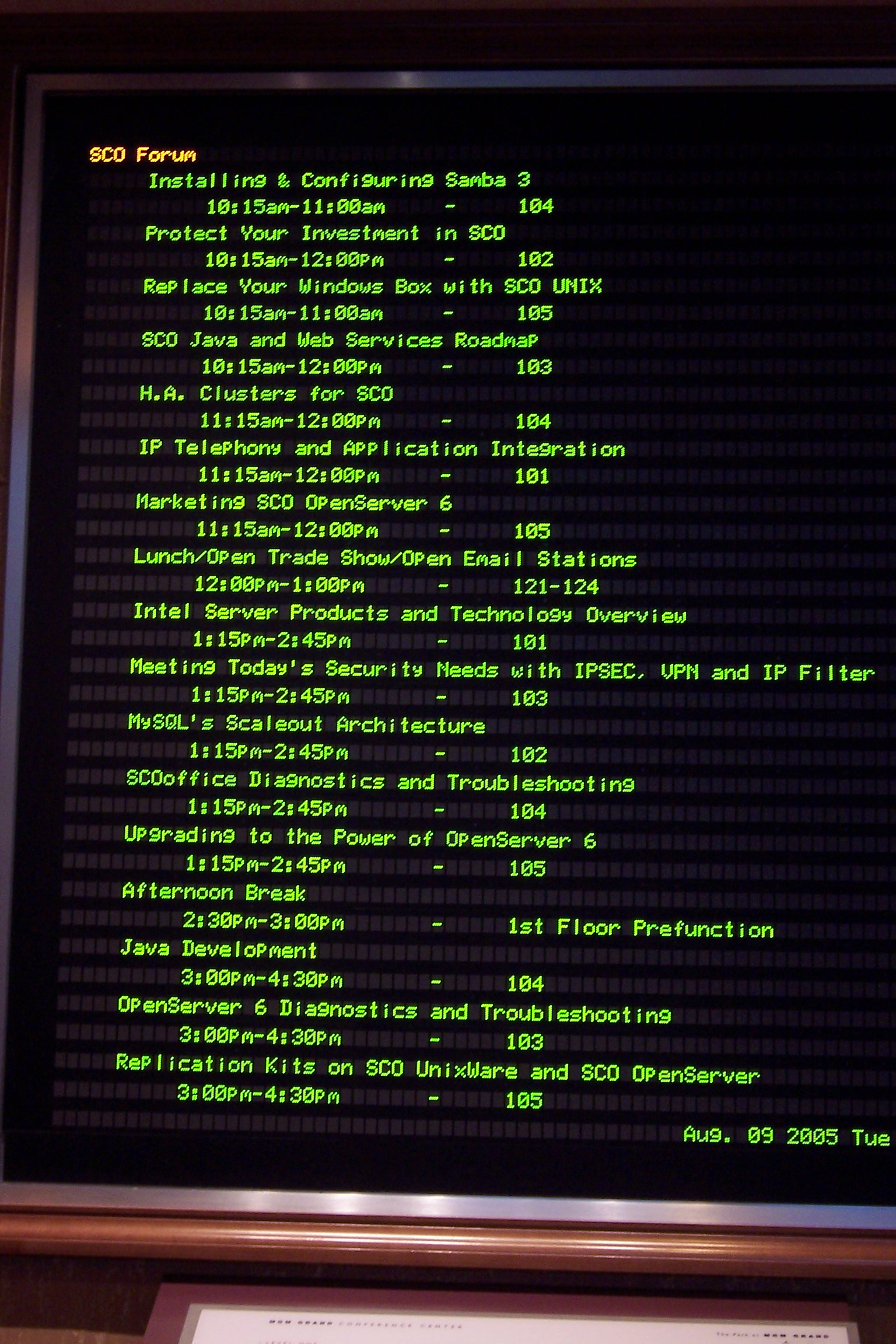
But regardless of headlines about the company, Vegas Forum breakout sessions focused on engineering-heavy product details and roadmaps ...

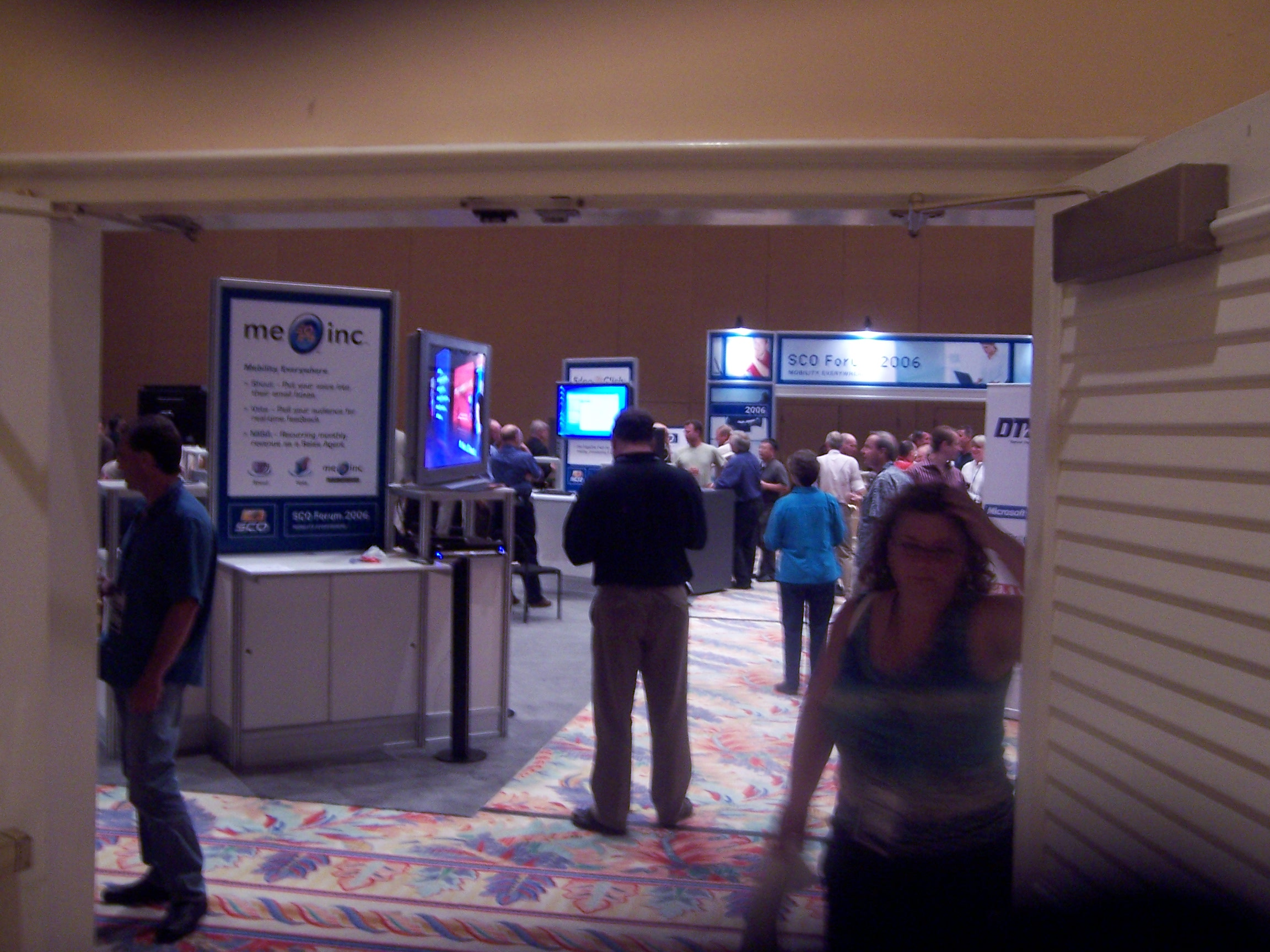
... and also showcased SCO's efforts in new markets, here in 2006 the Me Inc. initiative for smartphones.

SCO Forum 2004, themed "The Power of UNIX", explicitly emphasized the history of SCO Unix and ongoing product development work over the Linux matters. It attracted some 550 attendees. McBride said, "It's a quiet show and boring [perhaps for the media] in a good way. It shows we're committed to Unix and we're not just a litigation shop." A new program, SCO Marketplace, was unveiled, that would let developers bid on new development efforts of software that could be used on SCO Unix. When still faced with attention regarding legal issues, McBride said, "when people say we're only about litigation, it really bugs me. We have strong engineering talent, and 95 percent of our company is focused on building strong products, not on intellectual property litigation."

By SCO Forum 2005, the company said that attendance was 374, with invitations going out to only those from North America, and within that, only VARs and distributors and not end-customers. Events would be held in the rest of the world for partners elsewhere.

SCO Forum 2006 saw a move to The Mirage in Las Vegas. It also saw the return of Doug Michels to the SCO Forum stage, with McBride presenting him an award for lifetime achievement. But the main point of emphasis during this Forum was SCO's initiatives in the mobile app and mobile backend as a service spaces, as represented by its Me Inc. mobile software services and EdgeClick mobile application development platform. McBride said, "Today is the coming out party for Me Inc. Over the next few years, we want to be a leading provider of mobile application software to the marketplace. ... This is a seminal moment for us." The Forum 2006 schedule, subtitled "Mobility Everywhere", held some sixteen different breakout and training sessions related to Me Inc. and EdgeClick. One such new product, HipCheck, which allowed the remote monitoring of business-critical servers on Palm Treo smartphones, was given its debut announcement and demonstration at Forum.

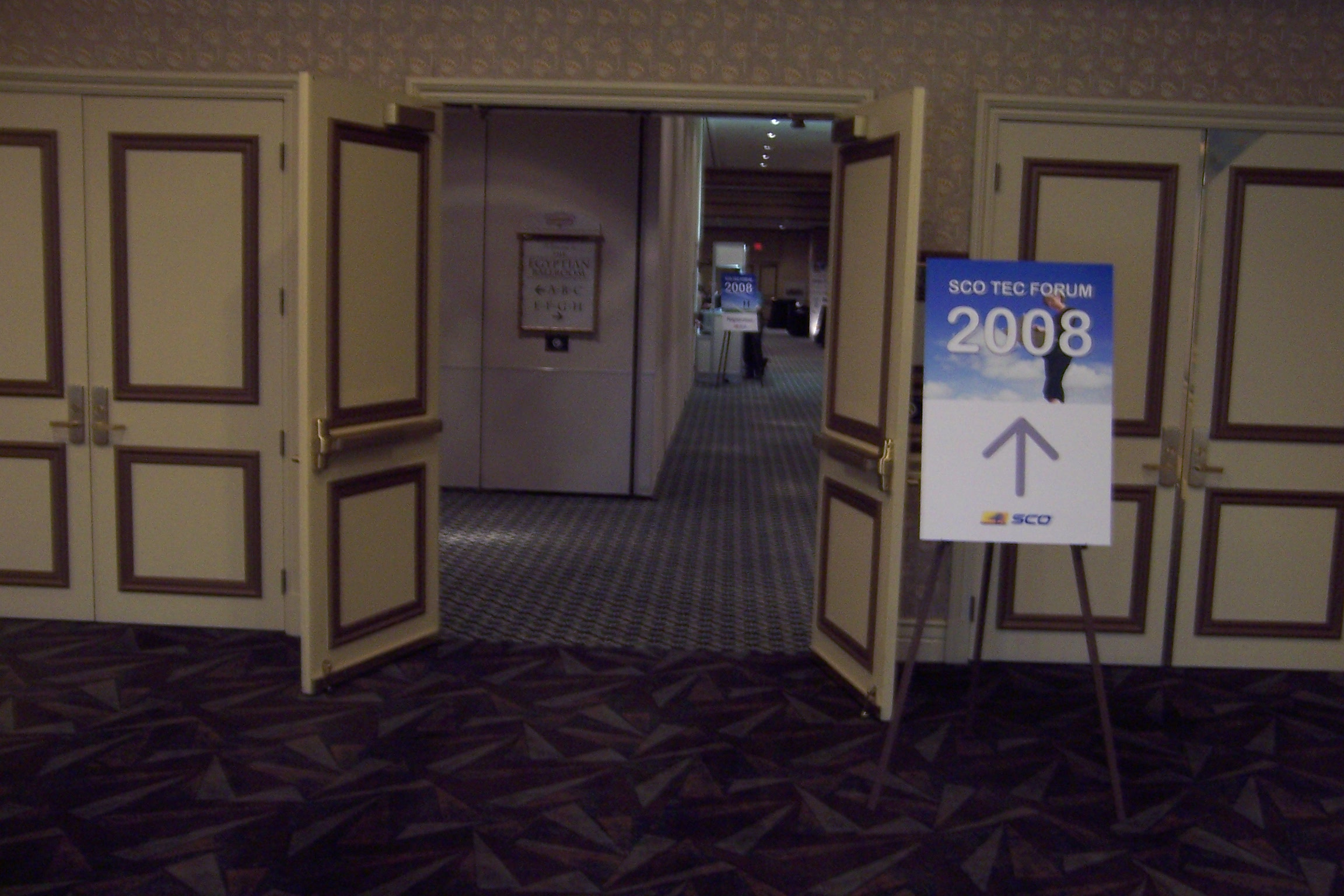
The final one: Hotel corridor sign for SCO Tec Forum 2008

As it happened, the mobility initiatives found difficulty gaining traction. For 2007, Forum was renamed to SCO Tec Forum and shortened in length to two full days, with technical breakout sessions replacing most of the keynotes and business sessions. Just three days after Tec Forum 2007 wrapped, SCO suffered an adverse ruling in the SCO v. Novell case that rejected SCO's belief in its ownership of Unix-related copyrights and undermined much of the rest of its legal position. The following month, SCO Group filed a voluntary petition for reorganization under Chapter 11 of the United States Bankruptcy Code.

The 2008 edition of SCO Tec Forum was first planned to take place in the spring, then in August as usual, and then finally took place during October 19–21, 2008, at the Luxor. This was the 22nd consecutive year of Forum; some attendees had continued to come to the conference year after year, as illustrated by the aforementioned SCO-focused reseller organization iXorg. But the company's financial situation continued to deteriorate and this was to be the last SCO Forum.

== List of Forums ==
Forum list
Year	Dates	Location	Formal title	SCO lead keynote	Noted guest speaker(s)/panelist(s)	Noted musical act(s)
1987		UC Santa Cruz	SCO XENIX 386 Developer Conference			
1988	c. Aug 22	UC Santa Cruz	SCO Forum '88			
1989	Aug 21–25	UC Santa Cruz	SCO Forum '89	Larry Michels, Doug Michels	Paul Maritz, Ray Noorda	
1990	Aug 20–24	UC Santa Cruz	SCO Forum '90			
1991	Aug 19–23	UC Santa Cruz	SCO Forum91			Tower of Power
1992	Aug 17–21	UC Santa Cruz	SCO Forum92	Larry Michels, Doug Michels	Andy Grove	
1993	Aug 14–19	UC Santa Cruz	SCO Forum93	Lars Turndal		
1994	Aug 21–25	UC Santa Cruz	SCO Forum94		John Perry Barlow, Phillipe Kahn	Deth Specula
1995	Aug 20–24	UC Santa Cruz	SCO Forum95	Alok Mohan	Scott Adams, Clifford Stoll, John Perry Barlow, Linus Torvalds	
1996	Aug 18–23	UC Santa Cruz	SCO Forum96	Alok Mohan	Scott McNealy, Glenn Ricart	Jefferson Starship
1997	Aug 17–22	UC Santa Cruz	SCO Forum97	Alok Mohan	Douglas Adams	The Kingsmen, The Surfaris
1998	Aug 16–21	UC Santa Cruz	SCO Forum98	Doug Michels	Dave Barry, Mary T. McDowell	Roger McGuinn; Jan and Dean, The Kingsmen, The Surfaris
1999	Aug 15–20	UC Santa Cruz	SCO Forum 1999	Doug Michels	Clayton M. Christensen, Frank Drake	Roger McGuinn; Indigo Swing
2000	Aug 20–23	UC Santa Cruz	Forum 2000	Doug Michels, Ransom Love		Roger McGuinn
2001	Aug 19–22	UC Santa Cruz	Caldera Forum 2001	Ransom Love	—	—
2002	Aug 25–27	Las Vegas MGM	[Caldera] GeoFORUM 2002	Darl McBride	—	—
2003	Aug 17–19	Las Vegas MGM	SCO Forum 2003	Darl McBride	—	—
2004	Aug 1–4	Las Vegas MGM	SCO Forum 2004	Darl McBride	Rob Enderle	—
2005	Aug 7–10	Las Vegas MGM	SCO Forum 2005	Darl McBride	—	—
2006	Aug 6-9	Las Vegas Mirage	SCO Forum 2006	Darl McBride	Doug Michels	—
2007	Aug 5–7	Las Vegas Mirage	SCO Tec Forum 2007	Darl McBride	—	—
2008	Oct 19–21	Las Vegas Luxor	SCO Tec Forum 2008	Darl McBride	—	—
