= Applixware =

Applixware is a suite of modular applications originally created by Applix, Inc. and now sold by Vistasource, Inc.

== Alis ==
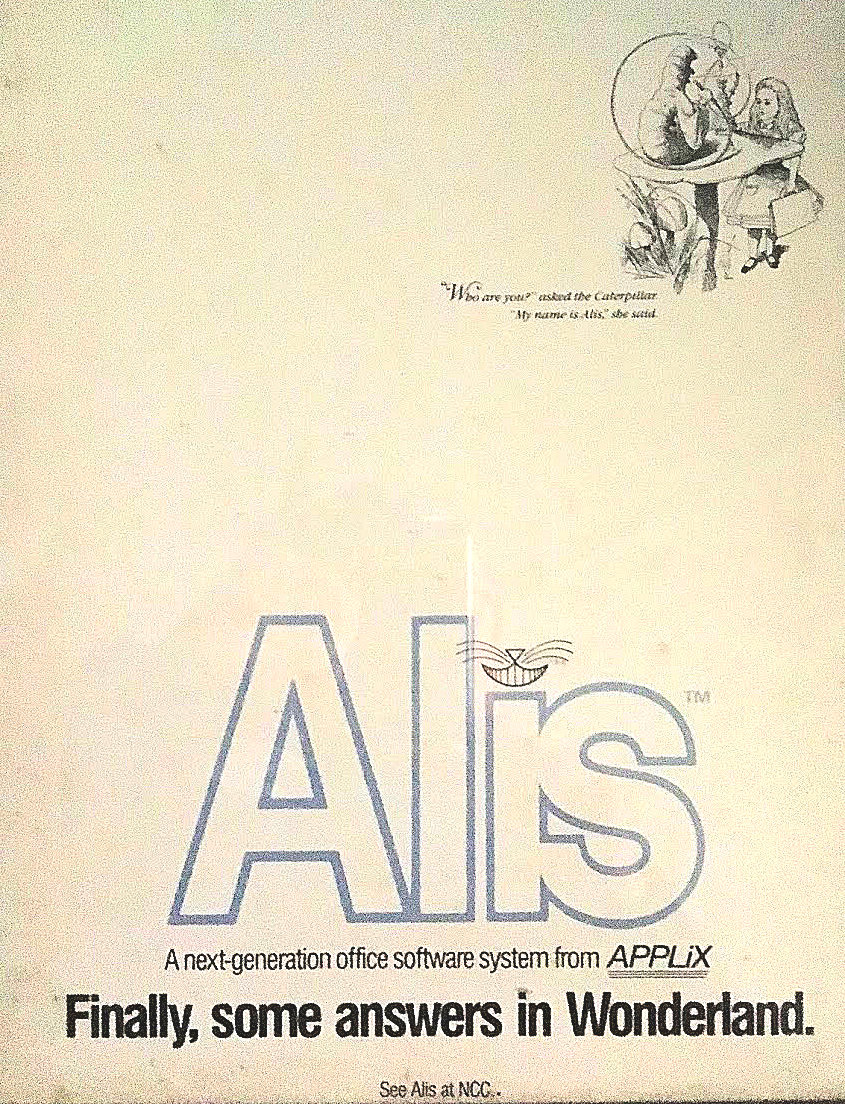
Alis office automation

Applix's first office suite, introduced in 1986, was called Alis, which was available for Unix workstations from Digital Equipment Corporation (DEC), Sun Microsystems and others. In addition to providing a graphical office suite environment with a number of modules including graphics editor and word processing functions, very advanced for the time, Alis was distinguished by a very powerful scripting language called "ELF" (Extended Language Facility), which was capable of, for example, reading spreadsheet data, performing calculations on it, and merging results into text documents.

Alis was marketed with promotional items themed around Alice's Adventures in Wonderland. One such was a mug depicting the tea party scene from the book, with a Cheshire Cat that disappeared when the mug was filled with a hot beverage.

== Aster*x and Applixware ==
Applixware's next major project in 1991 was called Aster*x, but was renamed to Applixware in 1993. During the mid-1990s, Applixware was one of a small number of WYSIWYG word processors available for Unix systems. Competitors included products from Island Software and proprietary software from the manufacturers of Unix workstations.

In the late 1990s, Linux began to emerge as a desktop operating system, and Applixware was ported to Red Hat Linux, becoming the first graphical office suite for the platform. Sales expanded to the point where Applixware was available across the USA as shrink-wrapped software on retail shelves at stores like CompUSA and Micro Center.

In 1999, Sun Microsystems bought a competing product, StarOffice, and turned it into the open source OpenOffice software suite. The release of StarOffice hurt the market for competing software, and Applixware sales declined.

== After OpenOffice ==
Applix Inc. began to seek other software markets, leveraging the power of their scripting engine and flexible architecture to expand into business intelligence software markets such as OLAP. Applixware is often used in the industrial world as a means of developing large scale Unix and Linux applications, and gluing together other applications.

The Applixware unit of the company was renamed Vistasource, Inc., and sold to Parallax Capital Partners in 2001.

Vistasource now offers a freely available limited version for home users on Linux.
