= Darl McBride =

American businessman

- Born: Darl McBride; 24 November 1959; Mesa, Arizona
- Died: 16 September 2024 (aged 64)
- Education: Brigham Young University (B.S.); University of Illinois at Urbana–Champaign (Master's degree)
- Occupation: Entrepreneur
- Known for: CEO of Shout, former CEO of SCO Group
- Spouse: Andrea Kimball McBride
- Children: 7

Darl Charles McBride (24 November 1959 – 16 September 2024) was an American entrepreneur and CEO of Shout TV Inc. He was the former CEO of The SCO Group. On March 7, 2003, during McBride's tenure as CEO of the company, the company initiated the SCO v. IBM litigation against IBM, alleging breach of contract and copyright infringement claims connected to Unix. SCO Group lost in a series of court battles, and was eventually forced into bankruptcy.

== Early life and education ==
McBride graduated from Brigham Young University with a degree in sociology and then earned a master's degree in industrial relations from the University of Illinois at Urbana–Champaign. While at the University of Illinois McBride was awarded a fellowship from IBM.

McBride was fluent in Japanese and spent two years in Japan as a missionary for the Church of Jesus Christ of Latter-day Saints.

== Early career ==
From 1988 to 1996, McBride was a manager at Novell, where he managed the business relationship with Novell KK (Japan) and later was promoted to vice president and general manager of the Novell Extended Networks Division for Novell Embedded Systems Technology (NEST). He later left Novell to become senior vice president of IKON Office Solutions.

IKON fired him in 1998 after his involvement in the execution of 33 business acquisitions. McBride then sued IKON for $10 million, claiming breach of contract, nonpayment of wages, and fraud. IKON counter-sued, and the case was eventually settled.

McBride was subsequently involved in two startups: SBI and Company, a professional services company, which he founded and served as CEO, and later PointServe, a software company of which he was also CEO. He raised venture capital for both of these companies. McBride was the president of Franklin Covey's online planning business from August 2000 until a few months prior to joining the SCO Group as CEO.

== Leadership of The SCO Group ==
McBride has been controversial in the information technology industry for his role as the CEO of SCO in asserting broad claims of intellectual property ownership of the various UNIX operating systems derivatives developed by IBM under a license originally granted by AT&T Corporation. Open source, free software and Linux developers and supporters, and the computer industry at large have been outspoken and highly critical and skeptical of McBride and SCO's claims in these areas.

Ty Mattingly, a former Novell Executive Vice President and co-worker of McBride was quoted as saying, "Congratulations. In a few short months you've dethroned Bill Gates as the most hated man in the industry." McBride claimed he received death threats as a result of the SCO-IBM lawsuits, and had a package of worms mailed to his home, prompting him to carry a firearm and to employ multiple bodyguards. During an interview, when asked about the popularity of the lawsuit against IBM, McBride answered: "We're either right or we're not. If we're wrong, we deserve people throwing rocks at us."

Under McBride's leadership, SCO saw a surge in stock price from under $2 in March 2003 to over $20 just six months later. Following several adverse rulings issued by the United States District Court in Utah, SCO's stock value dropped to under $1. On April 27, 2007, NASDAQ served notice that the company would be delisted if SCO's stock price did not increase above $1 for a minimum of 10 consecutive days over the course of 180 business days, ending October 22, 2007.

On August 10, 2007, the United States District Court in Utah issued a ruling that Novell had retained ownership of the System V UNIX copyrights and that SCO was in breach of its covenants to provide Novell with the previously agreed royalties to the Unix technology Novell had originally sold to SCO. Following this ruling, the value of SCO stock fell to just $0.44 per share, a one-day drop of more than 70%. On September 14, 2007, SCO filed for Chapter 11 bankruptcy protection, and by September 18 its share price had reached $0.18 per share.

On December 21, 2007, SCO received a NASDAQ delisting notice and trading was suspended on December 27, 2007. The stock price was $0.12 per share.

One of the reorganization plans put forward by SCO as part of its bankruptcy proceedings in Delaware required McBride to resign from SCO. The Memorandum of Understanding (MOU) between SCO and SNCP (Stephen Norris & Co. Capital Partners) included the note that "upon the effective date of the Proposed Plan of Reorganization, the existing CEO of the Company, Darl McBride, will resign immediately." The plan called for "a favorable resolution of the Novell/IBM Litigation". The plan was withdrawn by SCO following objections which highlighted the lack of detail given to the court and other interested parties about the plan.

On October 14, 2009, McBride was terminated as Chief Executive Officer and President of The SCO Group.

== Subsequent career ==
On April 9, 2010 McBride purchased the SCO Mobility intellectual property from The SCO Group for $100,000. McBride turned his purchase of SCO's mobility assets into a company called Shout TV Inc. It developed a mobile app called SHOUT, a free trivia game that integrated with live sporting events and awarded winners with cash and other prizes. Shout was acquired by MMA Global in 2018, and McBride left the combined company in 2021, after filing for personal bankruptcy in December 2020.

== Death ==
According to his published obituary, Darl McBride lost his life to ALS complications on Monday, September 16, 2024.
