= Canopy Group =

American investment firm

- Industry: Venture capital; Property management
- Founded: 1995
- Founder: Ray Noorda
- Headquarters: Lindon, Utah, United States of America
- Key people: Ralph Yarro III; William Mustard; Ron Heinz; Brandon Tidwell

The Canopy Group is an American investment and property management firm founded by Ray Noorda in 1995 through the Noorda Family Trust. It is headquartered in Lindon, Utah. The company has consisted of, or been known as, Canopy Technologies, Canopy Properties, and Canopy Ventures.

The Canopy Group served as the parent company of various start-up technology companies. It was one of the first venture capital firms in the Utah area and became a pioneer in the Utah high-technology space after investing in over a hundred such companies. One company that it invested in was The SCO Group. Canopy divested itself of SCO in 2005 with the settlement of the Yarro case.

In 2011, Canopy's technology venture arm was purchased by Signal Peak Ventures. Today, Canopy provides real estate and rental space to high-tech companies.

== History ==
=== Background ===
As its chief executive during the 1980s and early 1990s, Ray Noorda had taken the software company Novell to a dominant position in the network operating system space and in so doing became a personal computer industry pioneer. As a result, Noorda had a reported worth in the hundreds of millions of dollars.

The origins of the Canopy Group date to 1992, when Noorda created NFT Ventures as an arm of the Noorda Family Trust. NFT Ventures invested in a number of firms and helped to guide them. Through NFT Ventures and other means, Noorda had invested in several dozen start-up firms overall by 1995. In part, Noorda was interested in the venture capital business as a way to increase the funds that he could donate to Noorda Family Trust charities, but he was also interested in making his home state of Utah a place where entrepreneurs could thrive.

=== Early years ===
Noorda retired from Novell in 1994. In 1995, The Canopy Group was founded as a venture capital firm. (Some sources place the founding of the Canopy Group as having happened in 1992, but this may be a reference to the predecessor origins.) Venture capitalists were relatively uncommon at the time in Utah, for reasons both geographic and cultural.

Some of Noorda's investments were in technologies or strategies that he thought Novell should be involved in but was not, or were in companies whose products supported Novell's products or vice versa. These companies included Coresoft Technologies, KeyLabs Inc., Vinca Corp., and Helius Inc. Another early Canopy Group investment was Nombas, which unlike the others was located in the eastern portion of the country. In addition the ups and downs of Novell's fortunes led to executives or projects departing it and new companies being formed, some of which Canopy funded.

Subsequently the Canopy Group shifted its Novell-specific focus to one that was more geared towards open source software and network infrastructure projects in general. Noorda had an early interest in the potential of Linux and Canopy financed Caldera, Inc. starting in 1995. He subsequently financed several other Linux-related companies as well, such as Lineo and Linux Networx. Noorda and Canopy would still maintain an interest in some Novell affairs, however: in March 1998 the group's webpage indicated that the Novell Family Trust's 7.37 percent of Novell shares would be voted to withhold approval from most of the Novell board of directors running for re-election.

In June 1995, Noorda announced the creation of Canopy Technologies, which would provide marketing, distribution, and management services to small software companies. An early client of Canopy Technologies was Caldera, Inc. Canopy Technologies, which was based in Orem, Utah, would use an outsourcing model and take advantage of Noorda's network of firms and know-how. In 1996, Canopy Technologies, in league with Bain Capital, placed a bid to buy the WordPerfect division from Novell (the head of Canopy Technologies was Craig Bradley, a former WordPerfect executive). However, Corel Corporation's bid was accepted instead.

In 1996, Ralph J. Yarro III was named as the general manager of The Canopy Group. By 1998, the Canopy Group was invested in 24 different companies which in turn employed a total of around 1,000 people. Noorda became Utah's most prominent venture capitalist. However unlike many venture capital firms, the Canopy Group under Noorda was not focused on reaching an exit strategy for its investments; instead, Yarro said, Noorda "does it because he enjoys it, and he has the ability, both intellectually and financially, to pull it off." By the early 2000s, the Canopy Group had invested in dozens of companies, with 35 firms on its active roll as of 2003.

Besides investments and management activities, the Canopy Group was also active in provided buildings for technology companies to host their offices in. Their campus for these buildings was in Lindon, Utah. While some of the tenants of these buildings were companies Canopy had invested in, including the data center provider ViaWest, over half of the tenants were not related to Canopy.

=== Involvement with The SCO Group ===
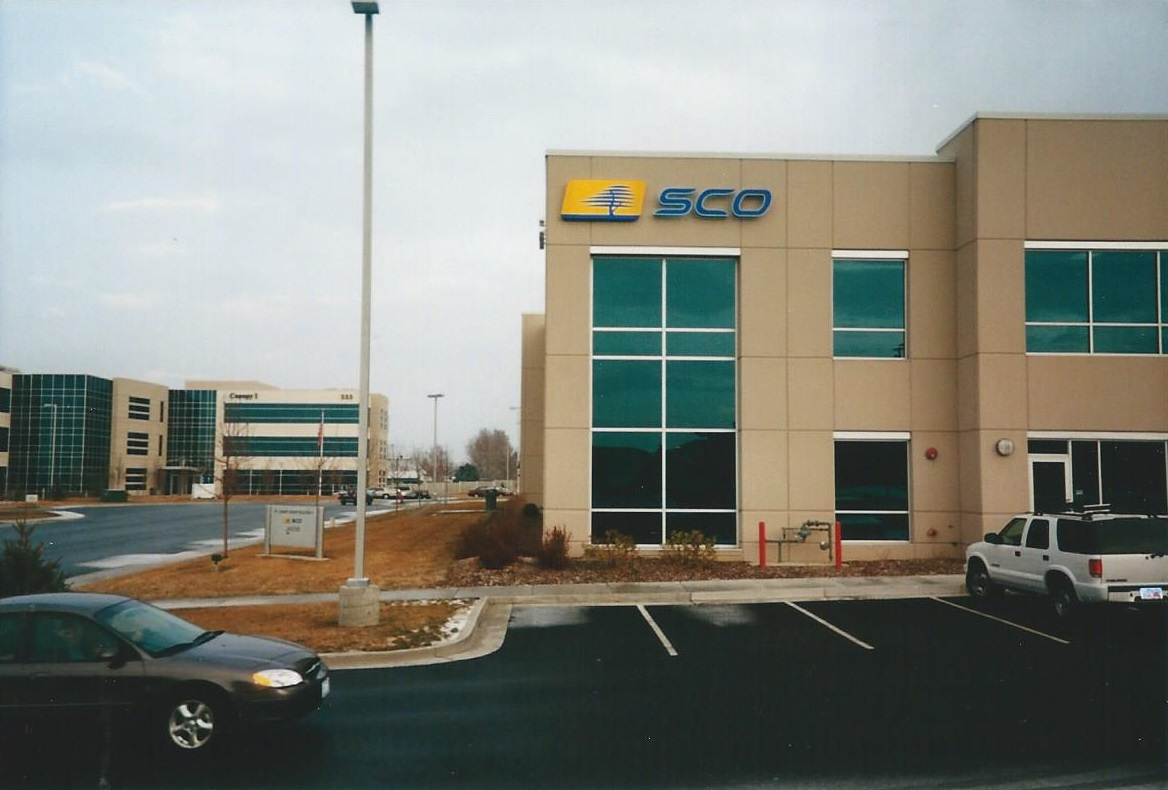
The Canopy Group was both an investor in, and a building provider for, The SCO Group, here seen in the Canopy II building in 2002

One of the Canopy Group's tenants, and a company they had 43 percent ownership of, was The SCO Group. This was the renamed form of Caldera International with a new management team and approach. By 2003, the SCO Group was receiving large amounts of attention due to the SCO v. IBM lawsuit and the surrounding SCO–Linux controversies, in which it said that Linux had infringed upon the intellectual property rights of the Unix operating system that the SCO Group owned via its predecessor company The Santa Cruz Operation. Much of industry opinion was against the SCO Group's legal actions. In particular reaction from the free and open source software community was intense and the SCO Group soon became, as Businessweek headlined, "The Most Hated Company In Tech".

As the largest owner in the SCO Group with two seats on SCO's board, the Canopy Group received substantial criticism as well. For instance, in July 2003, Fortune magazine emphasized the role that the Canopy Group was playing and called Yarro the "mastermind" behind the SCO v. IBM action. Columnist Frank Hayes of Computerworld examined how the SCO Group was acquiring Vultus Inc., another company controlled by Canopy, and concluded that Canopy was playing "a shell game ... to move its companies around" in order to exploit and cash in on the SCO Group's rising stock price. And in October 2013, a New York Times story said that Canopy "has played an important role ... in shaping SCO's legal strategy" and quoted Laura Didio, analyst for the Yankee Group, as saying "All roads lead to Canopy. They've been pretty clever in the way they've played this."

Canopy Group companies had been involved in two earlier legal actions, the winning Caldera v. Microsoft suit, which resulted in a favorable settlement in the neighborhood of $250 million, as well as a successful action on behalf of its Center 7 company against Computer Associates. Yarro said, "Intellectual property is everything. It's like location in real estate." But he reported that back in his home area in Utah, "I have had friends, good friends, tell me they can't believe what we're doing." So to criticism regarding its role with the SCO Group, Yarro said, "I know I've been painted in a rough light. I hope that our companies are our legacy and not our lawsuits."

=== Yarro case ===
Even when he was with Novell, Noorda had begun experiencing some memory lapses, a condition that was confirmed publicly at the time. By 2004, the 80-year-old Noorda was suffering from Alzheimer's disease, and a bitter fight broke out between Noorda family members and Canopy Group executives.

On 17 December 2004, Noorda and other shareholders ousted chief executive Yarro, chief financial officer Darcy Mott, and corporate counsel Brent Christensen, accusing them of having taken amounts of at least $25 million from Canopy Group through "a series of self-dealing and wasteful transactions". Yarro and the other executives sued in the Utah District Courts for $100 million for wrongful termination, claiming that Noorda had been unduly influenced, and Canopy countersued the three men. Each of the opposing parties in the lawsuits accused the other of taking advantage of Noorda's diminished state.

On 8 March 2005, the day before initial hearings were scheduled to begin, both parties negotiated a settlement out of court, ending the litigation. Yarro, Mott, and Christensen remained terminated, but an undisclosed amount of money was paid by the Canopy Group to them. Canopy agreed to relinquish ownership of all its 5.49 million shares in The SCO Group, transferring them to Yarro along with an undisclosed sum of money. Yarro thus became The SCO Group's largest shareholder, owning about a third of it, and kept his title as chairman of its board. While SCO remained a tenant in a Canopy Group building, there was no further connection between the two firms. Yarro, Mott, and Christensen resigned from any other Canopy companies they had been involved with.

Outside of Utah, much of the news of the conflict and settlement was filtered through its possible effect on the SCO Group and SCO's battle against Linux.

But locally, there was an acute additional sense of loss around the conflict. There was the scene of people squabbling amidst a computer industry pioneer's prolonged decline. And, as the Salt Lake Tribune wrote, "Suicides have ended up becoming the tragic bookends for the bitter struggle to control Utah's Canopy Group." The first was when Robert L. Penrose, Canopy's director of information systems and technology, died of suicide in December 2004, days after becoming distraught at the ouster of Yarro and the others, and the second was when Ray Noorda's daughter Val Noorda Kreidel, one of the major participants in the lawsuits, died of suicide in March 2005, less than a week after the settlement was reached. Looking at the whole situation, the CEO of Altiris, once a Canopy company, said, "Is this a tragedy or not? Ray Noorda and Canopy ... were key to our success. In 1998, they took the risk and invested in a little company out in Lindon, Utah, when [others] would not."

=== Subsequent activities ===
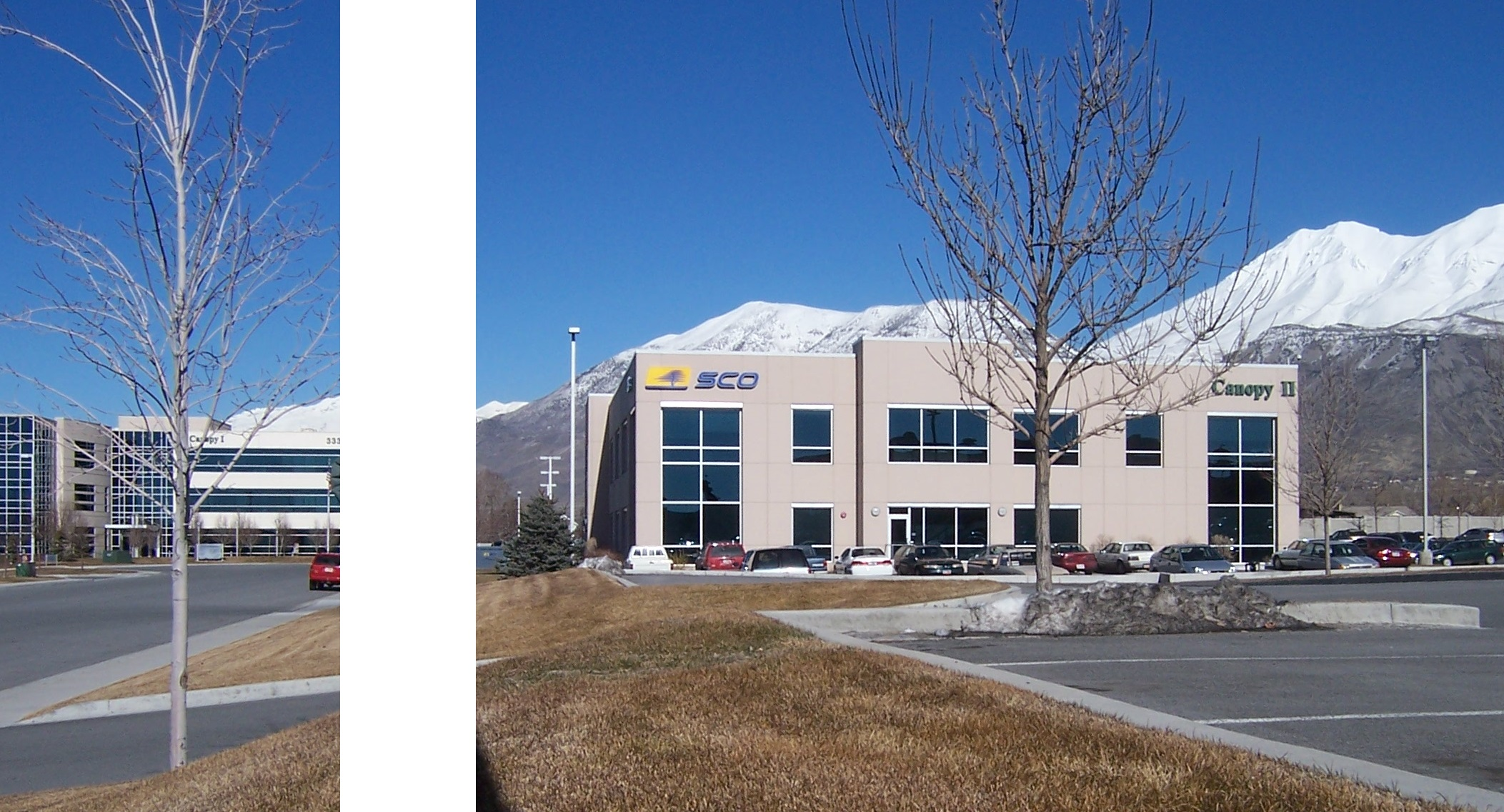
The Canopy I and Canopy II buildings in Lindon, Utah, as seen in 2005

Following Yarro's removal from the Canopy Group, Canopy subsequently appointed John Noorda and Andy Noorda, Ray Noorda's sons, to the Canopy Board of Directors. Following those appointments, John Noorda and Andy Noorda assumed control of the Canopy Group. William Mustard took over as CEO of the Canopy Group. However, there was little public activity for the next year or so, and companies with Canopy investments were unsure of what the future held. There were doubts expressed by some industry observers that the Canopy Group would even survive.

They then hired Ron Heinz of Canopy portfolio company Helius, a provider of satellite Internet technology, as managing director. Brandon Tidwell became the other managing partner. Under this new leadership, the group looked to revitalize its portfolio, take a more public role towards early seed funding, and actively invest in Utah high technology companies and their development again.

Accordingly, around 2006, Canopy Venture Partners was created. This entity launched the Canopy Ventures I portfolio of companies, which invested in software and other technology companies in the Web 2.0 and network security spaces among others. In September 2006 the Canopy Group made a major investment in Solera Networks, a network security forensics firm founded in 2004 and headed by former Caldera and Lineo co-founder Bryan Sparks; it was the first investment of any significance that Canopy had made in two years.

Ray Noorda died in October 2006 after his long battle with Alzheimer's. By then, the Canopy Group had invested in a total of over a hundred start-up companies. And it was no longer unique, as a number of other important venture capital firms were operating in Utah as well.

In 2008, the Canopy Ventures II portfolio was announced. This had a $100 million investment fund behind it, the largest in the Canopy Group's history, consisting of proceeds from the sale of Canopy Ventures I companies as well as new monies from the Noorda family. Canopy Ventures II invested not just in the kind of computer-related technology companies it had in the past but also in technology-focused life sciences companies. By 2011, the two portfolio funds had invested in a total of eighteen companies and exited from six of them, and according to Heinz the companies involved had gotten through the Great Recession reasonably well.

In 2011, the Canopy Group decided to exit the venture capital business and focus solely on its building management and real estate holdings business. Accordingly its technology venture arm was purchased by Signal Peak Ventures, a firm founded by Heinz, Tidwell, and others who had worked at Canopy Group. Ten companies that had been funded by the Canopy Ventures portfolios moved over to funding from the new venture. Signal Peak Ventures has continued operations into the 2020s.

The Canopy Group had stayed active in the building space as well, deciding in 2005 to add a fifth building to its Lindon campus. Canopy Properties, which employs Cushman & Wakefield for its building services, has continued on into the 2020s with its five-building campus in Lindon.

== List of companies Canopy had investments in ==
The companies that the Canopy Group had investments in included the following:

- Altiris (1998–2005)
- AvenueMe
- AxiomPress (subsidiary of Geolux)
- Caldera (1994–2000)
  - Caldera Systems (1998–2001)
  - Caldera International (2001–2002)
  - Caldera Thin Clients (1998–1999)
- Center7 (C7 Data Centers)
- Cerberian (?–2004)
- ClearstoneHealth (subsidiary of Geolux)
- Cogito Inc.
- Communitect
- Coresoft Technologies
- Data Crystal
- DeviceLogics (2002–?)
- DigitalHarbor
- DirectPointe
- Embedix (2002–2002)
- Fatpipe
- Geolux
- GMMI/Ridgeline
- Helius
- Homepipeline
- iArchives
- Industrial Training Zone (ITZ, subsidiary of Geolux)
- Januslogix
- KeyLabs
- Learning Optics (subsidiary of Geolux)
- Lineo (1999–2002)
- Linux Networx
- Luxul
- MaxStream
- Mi-Co
- MTI (storage company)
- MyFamily.com
- Nombas
- North Face Learning
- Perimeter Labs
- Planetearthtools
- Pointecast
- Power innovations
- The SCO Group (2002–2005)
- Smart Chip Technologies
- Solera Networks
- SurfChina
- Trolltech
- Tuglet
- ViaWest
- Vinca Corporation
- Vultus
- WildWorks
- Wrenchhead
