= SVS =

SVS may refer to:

== Technology ==
- Advanced Space Vision System, a computer vision system for the ISS
- OS/VS2 (SVS), a precursor of MVS
- ScanScope Virtual Slide, a medical image file format (".svs" suffix)
- Software Virtualization Solution, by Symantec
- Supply Voltage Supervisor, an electronic protective device
- Surround-view system, assisted driving system with multiple cameras
- Synthetic vision system for aircraft
- Singing voice synthesis

== Organizations and companies ==
- Scottish Vegetarian Society
- Second Viennese School
- Society for Vascular Surgery
- Sudbury Valley School
- State Veterinary Service, UK
- Saint Vladimir's Orthodox Theological Seminary, Crestwood, NY, US
- Svenska Vitterhetssamfundet, Swedish publisher
- SVS/Triumph Home Video

== Transport ==
- Seven Sisters station, London, England, National Rail station code
- Stevens Village Airport, IATA code

== Other uses ==
- Standard VIE Settings, of SubSpace video game
- Specific Area Message Encoding, US emergency weather event code
- S. V. Sahasranamam, Indian actor
- Schwartz Value Survey, a personality test
