= The CP80 Foundation =

Organization in the United States

The CP80 Foundation is an organization in the United States that advocates regulating the Internet to make it easier for users to filter out pornography. The foundation suggests using education, Internet governance, and legislation to achieve its goals.

Its legislative efforts include the proposed Internet Community Ports Act (ICPA), which would organize the ports as defined by the TCP/IP protocol suite into "community ports" and "open ports", requiring that obscene material exclusively use the open ports. Among the ports they propose designating as a community port is port 80, the standard port for the hypertext transport protocol (HTTP), the transport mechanism used to support the World Wide Web. This is advocated in order to permit easier filtering of such material by firewalls, content-control software, and other devices or programs.

The Utah legislature has approved a resolution calling upon the United States Congress to pass the proposed legislation.

As part of a campaign to prevent minors from accessing pornography, the foundation also advocates legislation to fine Wifi router users who leave their routers open for anyone to use.

The American Library Association maintains a list of studies discrediting approaches such as those taken by CP80 at Filters and Filtering.

The CP80 Foundation was established in 2005. Its chairman is Ralph Yarro III who is also chairman of the board of the SCO Group.
