= Internet Community Ports Act =

The Internet Community Ports Act (ICPA), created and advocated by The CP80 Foundation (aka "Clean Port 80"), is an approach to HTTP content filtering, leveraging Transmission Control Protocol ports to segregate content between "Community Ports" and "Open Ports." "Community Ports" would be for content that is not considered "obscene or harmful" to children; "Open Ports" would be for all other content, including content only considered suitable for adults, such as pornography. According to the advocates of ICPA, this would enable an individual to, through their ISP's firewall, choose the content they want by port, allowing content or blocking out content individually. Advocates of ICPA would particularly like to remove "objectionable" content from Port 80, the standard port for World-Wide Web traffic (but by no means all Internet traffic, making the title somewhat of a misnomer).

CP80 is chaired by Ralph Yarro III, who is also the chair of the SCO Group.

The CP80 Foundation claims its solution is based on an individual's choice and the use of existing technology. They also claim the solution is a fair and balanced answer to an alleged "Internet Porn Problem". They conclude that the ICPA (Internet Community Ports Act) "protects" children and individuals while simultaneously "preserving" the First Amendment for all.

While the ICPA has not yet been introduced into the US Congress, it is said to have the support of a number of the Utah members of Congress including Sen. Orrin Hatch (R-Utah), (former) Rep. Chris Cannon (R-Utah), (former) Rep. Jim Matheson (D-Utah) and Rep. Rob Bishop (R-Utah). CP80 has reportedly made presentations to these members of Congress. Sen. Hatch has been quoted as stating "We have to pursue creative and innovative solutions to this growing public health threat, and CP80 is one of the leaders in that effort." Some may consider a proposal calling for the creation of a .xxx domain as similar, but was reportedly blocked by ICANN at the request of the US Government.

The CP80 Foundations claims the ICPA is different in several important ways from the .xxx domain proposal. The ICPA, if passed, would be a federal law, while the .xxx domain was always intended to be voluntary. ICPA would preserve all current URLs and current naming conventions, the .xxx domain would not. ICPA provides a mechanism of recourse against a non-compliant web publisher or content provider under US law, .xxx domain has no such mechanism. ICPA would provide a more secure and robust solution as the content blocking happens at the ISP level, whereas blocking of the .xxx domain would happen at the end user browser level.

The CP80 Foundation claims its ICPA also attempts to address the international "Porn Problem". If the ICPA were to pass an end user would have several choices to make in terms of their Internet experience. The end user would choose Community ports or both Open and Community ports. If the end user chooses Community ports only, the end user could then decide to allow all IP's from foreign countries or just the IP's from compliant countries or no foreign IP's, all of this configuration would happen at the ISP level. In addition, The CP80 Foundation also supports a movement to use the IANA function, which is still currently administered by the US Government, to enforce the ICPA's proposed separation of content internationally as part of "A New Internet Evolution", disseminating down though the current ranks of Internet governance including regional Internet registries (RIR), ISPs and finally web publishers and content providers. This would address any international web publisher or content provider who is not conforming to the "New Evolution" of the Internet.

== Criticism ==
ICPA cannot be enforced internationally. As is problematic with other Internet legislation, the US does not have extraterritorial rights to force compliance among entities outside its borders.

It also assumes that the most important attribute of all material content distributed on the Internet is whether or not it is "adult" or pornographic (presumably matching some criteria in the minds of the proposers). These are the only forms of content that could be censored by the US Government consistent with the US Constitution. However, many find depictions of violence, intolerance, extremist views, sexist messages or racist content more problematic. The ICPA as a government mandate cannot provide a practical mechanism whereby a myriad of other attributes of material could be assessed and categorised for suitability. This is contrasted with the voluntary Platform for Internet Content Selection which fully enables individuals to voluntarily screen content consistent with their personal world-views.

The current proposal, concentrating as it does on "pornography", does not address any of these aspects, or the presumable requirement to address different combinations of unsuitable materials, dependent on local, cultural, or individual preferences or views. In the absence of any common view as to what attributes of content, if any, require regulation, the most pragmatic approach would appear to be eschew censorial categorisation of any form, and allow individuals to filter their own access.

The ICPA seeks to criminalize obscenity sent over "community ports". Obscenity is already illegal pursuant to 18 U.S.C. §§ 1460-1466 to 47 U.S.C. § 223(a) & (b). Certainly no publisher of content would have an incentive to label their content "obscene" for purposes of not being put on "community ports" where such an announcement would subject them to criminal liability.

Critics have also likened the proposal to the "evil bit" of RFC 3514 due to problems of defining what types of content qualify.

== Sources and notes ==
1. "CP80 Internet Community Port Act". www.cp80.org. Archived from the original on July 5, 2006.
1. Mark Gibbs (December 5, 2005). "Putting lipstick on the Internet porno-pig, Network World Fusion". Network World.
1. Jared Page (November 28, 2005). "Utah tries new tack in battle over Net porn". Deseret News. Archived from the original on November 3, 2012.
1. Annalee Newitz (January 3, 2006). "Web Censorship for Dummies". AlterNet.
1. Mark Gibbs (January 19, 2006). "Grey Matter for Internet Scissors". IT World Canada. Archived from the original on May 4, 2016.
