= SWV (disambiguation) =

SWV or Sisters with Voices is an American female contemporary R&B group.

SWV may also refer to:

- ISO 639:swv or Shekhawati language, an Indo-Aryan language
- Severo-Evensk Airport (IATA: SWV), Evensk, Russia
- Something Weird Video, American home video company
- Squarewave voltammetry, a form of linear potential sweep voltammetry
- Symantec Workspace Virtualization, an application virtualization solution for Microsoft Windows
- Schütz-Werke-Verzeichnis, catalogue of compositions by Heinrich Schütz
- Southern West Virginia, region of West Virginia

== See also ==
- SW5 (disambiguation)
