= ICPA =

ICPA may stand for:

- International Corrections and Prisons Association, an international nonprofit association for criminal justice professionals to share ideas and practices aimed at advancing professional corrections
- Internet Community Ports Act, proposed but not introduced U.S. federal legislation on content filtering
- International Certificate for Piano Artists, an international certification programme for pianists
