= Pedestal Software =

- Type: Private
- Founded: Newton, Massachusetts U.S. (1996)
- Fate: Acquired
- Successor: Altiris
- Headquarters: Newton, United States
- Number of employees: 50 (2005)
- Website: www.pedestalsoftware.com

Pedestal Software was a company specializing in computer security founded in 1996 by Fernando Trias and Keith Woodard and sold to Altiris in 2005 for $65 million. It was headquartered in Newton, Massachusetts with satellite offices in San Francisco, Chicago and London. It was funded by the founders, Venrock and 3i and employed over 50 people when it was sold. Altiris was later acquired by Symantec.

| Product | Purpose |
|---|---|
| SecurityExpressions | Audits security settings across large networks |
| AuditExpress | Used by security auditors and consultants |
| NTSEC | Allows administrators to script and automate complex tasks |
| Intact | Monitors and prevents changes to a computer's files and configuration |
