= SW5 =

SW5 may refer to:

- SW postcode area
- Earl's Court, a district in the Royal Borough of Kensington and Chelsea in central London
- SW5 tram, a class of electric trams, some built by the Melbourne & Metropolitan Tramways Board, but most modified from the W2 tram by the Metropolitan Transit Authority.
- Star Wars Episode V: The Empire Strikes Back, a 1980 American epic space opera film directed by Irvin Kershner
- Fernvale LRT station, Singapore

== See also ==
- S5W
- SWV (disambiguation)
- SW (disambiguation)
