= Ralph Yarro III =

American businessman

Ralph Yarro
- Education: BA Political Science, Brigham Young University
- Organization(s): Atua Ventures - Co-founder and Managing Director
- Known for: Venture Capitalism, Entrepreneurship, and Activism
- Notable work: The Canopy Group, CP80, Atua Ventures
- Board member of: Techcyte, The SCO Group, Altiris, Maxstream

Ralph J. Yarro is an American business executive, entrepreneur and an activist. He co-founded Atua Ventures and was previously the CEO of the Canopy Group. Yarro has been associated with various technology companies, including Altiris, Caldera, Techcyte, Center 7, Lineo, Linux Networx, and Voonami.

In 2006, Yarro founded The CP80 Foundation, an organization focused on censoring internet pornography.

== Background ==
Yarro relocated to Utah in 1982 and pursued a BA in Political Science at Brigham Young University. and served an LDS mission to Buenos Aires, Argentina. He later undertook postgraduate studies at the University of Utah, focusing on Computer Aided Design, User Interface (UI), Graphics, and Fine Art. He began his career in computer game design and subsequently joined Novell. Within Novell, he was an original member of the Corsair project team, which aimed to develop technology that would compete with Microsoft and keep Novell competitive. .

== Career ==
=== The Canopy Group & SCO Group ===
His tenure with Novell allowed Yarro to collaborate with Ray Noorda across various Noorda family enterprises. in 1995, he advanced to the position of president and CEO of The Canopy Group, Inc. By 2000, under Yarro's leadership, The Canopy Group's portfolio expanded to include over 50 companies such as Altiris, Caldera Systems, Lineo, Helius, Center 7, Maxstream, KeyLabs, MTI, MyFamily.com, Lineo, Linux Networx, and Vintela among others.

He also became the chairman of the board of the SCO Group, Inc., holding a significant share of SCO's common stock.

=== Companies founded ===
In 2005, Yarro established ThinkAtomic, Inc., aimed at supporting emerging technology ventures. He was the company's president and CEO until he partnered with Mike Wolfgramm to merge their companies, leading to the inception of Atua Ventures. Yarro presently serves as the managing director of Atua Ventures. He is the founder of many tech companies, including Techcyte and Voonami. Techcyte integrates technology, especially Artificial Intelligence, in digital diagnostics, while Voonami provides data center services for startups in Utah.

Yarro, along with his brother Justin, also co-founded Ximbiot, Inc., an industrial design company that produced products like Zimbi, a fruit-flavored punch in distinctive rocket-shaped bottles.

=== Board memberships ===
Yarro has invested in and secured roles ranging from, chairman, board member, to trustee in a variety of technology firms, both national and international, such as Altiris, Caldera, Lineo, Maxstream, MyFamily.com, Troll Tech, Copilot, Katoa Biotech, Xymbiot, Yarro studios, and others. By 2006, he is known to have made investments in more than 120 companies.

=== Canopy lawsuit (2004–2005) ===
From 2004–2005, Yarro faced a legal dispute after his termination from his role as director of the Canopy Group. He, alongside executives Darcy Mott and Brent Christensen, was dismissed by founders Ray and Lewena Noorda. The trio subsequently sued Canopy for US$100 million, alleging wrongful termination instigated by Val Noorda Kreidel, Ray Noorda's daughter. In response, the Canopy Group, managed by William Mustard, countersued Yarro for alleged misappropriation of $20 million. The case was settled on March 8, 2005. The terms included Yarro acquiring all Canopy Group shares in The SCO Group and receiving an undisclosed settlement amount. All three plaintiffs relinquished their roles and interests in Canopy.

== Activism ==
=== Yarro's Law (S.B. 239) ===
In 2003, Yarro promoted the passage of a bill to align Utah's IP laws with those of California. Known as "The Unfair Competition Law", it was ratified in 2004 and was referenced in subsequent legal proceedings, notably SCO's lawsuit against IBM.

=== CP80 ===
Starting in 2006, Yarro exerted efforts to combatting internet pornography. He established the non-profit organization CP80, which offers resources and information to help protect children on the internet. Yarro advocated for legislation to segregate mature content, assigning a separate port distinct from the default HTTP port 80. He asserts that this provides an equitable balance between online safety and free speech. Collaborating with legal scholars and other stakeholders, Yarro seeks nationwide support for this initiative.

On March 13, 2007, Utah Governor Jon Huntsman Jr. endorsed House Concurrent Resolution 3, promoting stricter federal regulations on Internet pornography, with CP80 foundation playing a pivotal role in the legislation. Yarro subsequently proposed that Internet Service Providers (ISPs) be responsible for content on open wireless access ports, ensuring children's safety online, imposing fines on violators and suggesting tax incentives for compliant ISPs. This proposal faced opposition from some local ISPs.

=== Political contributions ===
Yarro contributed political campaigns as an extension of his activism. Notably, he has supported Senator Orrin Hatch and Chris Cannon of Utah. In 2007, he contributed to Mitt Romney's presidential campaign and later to John McCain's campaign after Romney's withdrawal. In 2020, he supported John Curtis in his re-election campaign for Utah's 3rd Congressional District and also backed Burgess Owens for the 4th Congressional District of Utah.
