= Altiris =

Company

Altiris Inc.
- Type: Symantec Subsidiary
- Industry: Enterprise management software, IT asset management lifecycle management, service-oriented software management, systems configuration management
- Founded: 1998
- Fate: Acquired by Symantec, which was later acquired by Broadcom
- Headquarters: Lindon, Utah, United States
- Key people: Gregory S. Butterfield Chairman and CEO, Stephen C. Erickson CFO
- Products: Helpdesk Solutions, Carbon Copy Solutions, Barcode solution, Inventory Solution Wise Package Studio
- Revenue: No longer disclosed
- Operating income: No longer disclosed
- Net income: No longer disclosed
- Number of employees: No longer disclosed
- Website: www.altiris.com

Altiris Inc. is a subsidiary of Symantec specializing in service-oriented management software which allows organizations to manage IT assets. They also provide software for web services, security, and systems management products. Established in 1998, Altiris is headquartered in Lindon, Utah, United States. Altiris has over 20,000 customers managing more than 3 million servers and 60 million desktops and laptops.

== Corporate history ==
Altiris was started in 1998 when Jan Newman and Kevin Turpin spun off the software arm of KeyLabs. KeyLabs was, and remains, a third party testing facility. The Altiris Software had been created at KeyLabs to manage the computers at KeyLabs and that software became the start of what is now Altiris. Altiris continues to develop software designed to help IT departments manage their networks and computers more efficiently.

In early 2000, Jan Newman who was then President and CEO brought in Greg Butterfield to take over the role of President and CEO. Under Mr. Butterfield's leadership, Altiris acquired Computing Edge in September 2000. Computing Edge's founder, Dwain Kinghorn, had come from Microsoft and helped to develop Microsoft's original Systems Management Server product (SMS). Computing Edge specialized in extending and enhancing with functionality that SMS lacked.

Altiris continued its market expansion by acquiring several other companies:

=== Acquisitions ===
- July 2002 - Altiris acquired system backup and recovery technology from Previo (see Stac Electronics).
- December 2003 - Altiris acquired application deployment specialist Wise Solutions, Inc.
- February 2004 - Altiris acquired FSLogic. See Software Virtualization Solution
- September 2004 - Altiris acquired Bridgewater Technologies.
- January 2005 - Altiris acquired Tonic Software Inc.
- March 2005 - Altiris acquired Pedestal Software, a software company that specializes in vulnerability assessment tools (SecurityExpressions and AuditExpress).
- February 2007 - Altiris to be acquired by Symantec Corp. (Nasdaq: SYMC)
- April 2007 - Altiris acquisition by Symantec Corp. (Nasdaq: SYMC) completed.

=== Acquired by Broadcom ===
On Nov. 4, 2019, Broadcom announced that it had completed its acquisition of the Enterprise Security business of Symantec Corporation. The symantec.com domain currently redirects to broadcom.com.

== See also ==
- Systems management
- Network management
- System administration
- Configuration management
