= SCO Group =

American software company

The SCO Group, Inc.

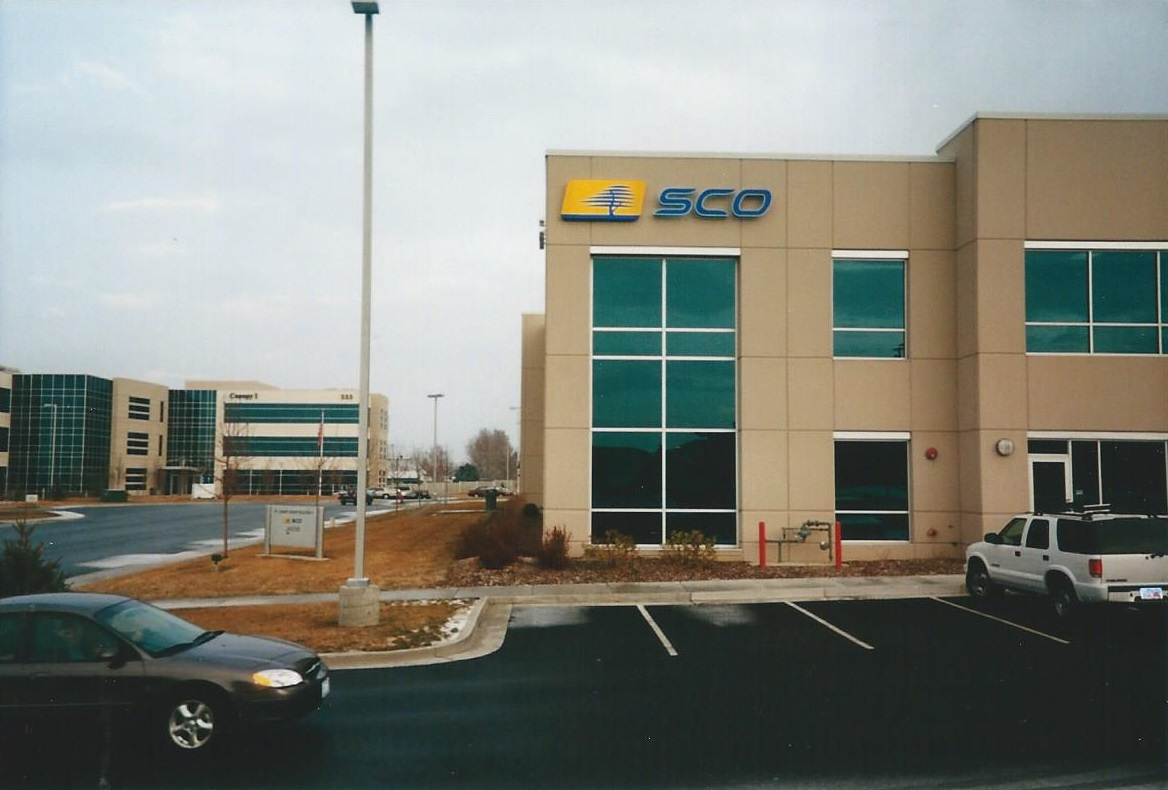
- Headquarters office in Lindon, Utah, featuring the new SCO logo, pictured in December 2002
- Type: Public
- Traded as: Nasdaq: SCOX (later pink sheets as SCOXQ.PK)
- Industry: Computer software
- Founded: 2002
- Defunct: 2012
- Fate: 2011, sold off Unix and mobility assets, existed only via bankruptcy trustee; 2012, filed for Chapter 7 liquidation
- Successor: UnXis/Xinuos
- Headquarters: Lindon, Utah, United States
- Number of locations: Murray Hill/Florham Park, New Jersey; Santa Cruz/Scotts Valley, California; Delhi, India; several regional offices
- Key people: Darl McBride, CEO; Ralph Yarro III, Chairman; Ken Nielsen, CFO; Ryan E. Tibbitts, General Counsel; Chris Sontag, head of SCOsource; Jeff Hunsaker, President of SCO Operations Inc; Sandy Gupta; Andy Nagle
- Products: UnixWare; OpenServer; SCOoffice Server; Me Inc. mobility products; SCO Mobile Server; HipCheck
- Revenue: $79 million (peak, 2003); $16 million (2008)
- Net income: $3.4 million (peak, 2003); $−8.7 million (2008)
- Number of employees: 340 (peak, 2003); 63 (2009)
- Website: www.sco.com

The SCO Group (often referred to SCO and later called The TSG Group) was an American software company in existence from 2002 to 2012. It became known for owning Unix operating system assets that had belonged to the Santa Cruz Operation (the original SCO), including the UnixWare and OpenServer technologies. Under CEO Darl McBride, it pursued a series of high-profile legal battles known as the SCO–Linux controversies.

The SCO Group began in 2002 with a renaming of Caldera International, accompanied by McBride becoming CEO and a major change in business strategy and direction. The SCO brand was re-emphasized, and new releases of UnixWare and OpenServer came out. The company also attempted some initiatives in the e-commerce space with the SCOBiz and SCOx programs. In 2003, the SCO Group claimed that the increasingly popular free Linux operating system contained substantial amounts of Unix code that IBM had improperly put there. The SCOsource division was created to monetize the company's intellectual property by selling Unix license rights to use Linux. The SCO v. IBM lawsuit was filed, asking for billion-dollar damages and setting off one of the top technology battles in the history of the industry. By a year later, four additional lawsuits had been filed involving the company.

Reaction to SCO's actions from the free and open-source software community was intensely negative, and the general IT industry was not enamored of the actions either. SCO soon became, as Businessweek headlined, "The Most Hated Company in Tech". SCO Group stock rose rapidly during 2003, but then SCOsource revenue became erratic and the stock began a long fall. Despite the industry's attention to the lawsuits, SCO continued to maintain a product focus as well, putting out a major new release of OpenServer that incorporated the UnixWare kernel inside it. SCO also made a major push in the burgeoning smartphones space, launching the Me Inc. platform for mobility services. But despite these actions, the company steadily lost money and shrank in size.

In 2007, SCO suffered a major adverse ruling in the SCO v. Novell case that rejected SCO's claim of ownership of Unix-related copyrights and undermined much of the rest of its legal position. The company filed for Chapter 11 bankruptcy protection soon after and attempted to continue operations. Its mobility and Unix software assets were sold off in 2011, to McBride and UnXis respectively. Renamed to The TSG Group, the company converted to Chapter 7 bankruptcy in 2012. A portion of the SCO v. IBM case continued on until 2021, when a settlement was reached for a tiny fraction of what the SCO Group had initially sued for.

== Initial history ==
=== Background ===
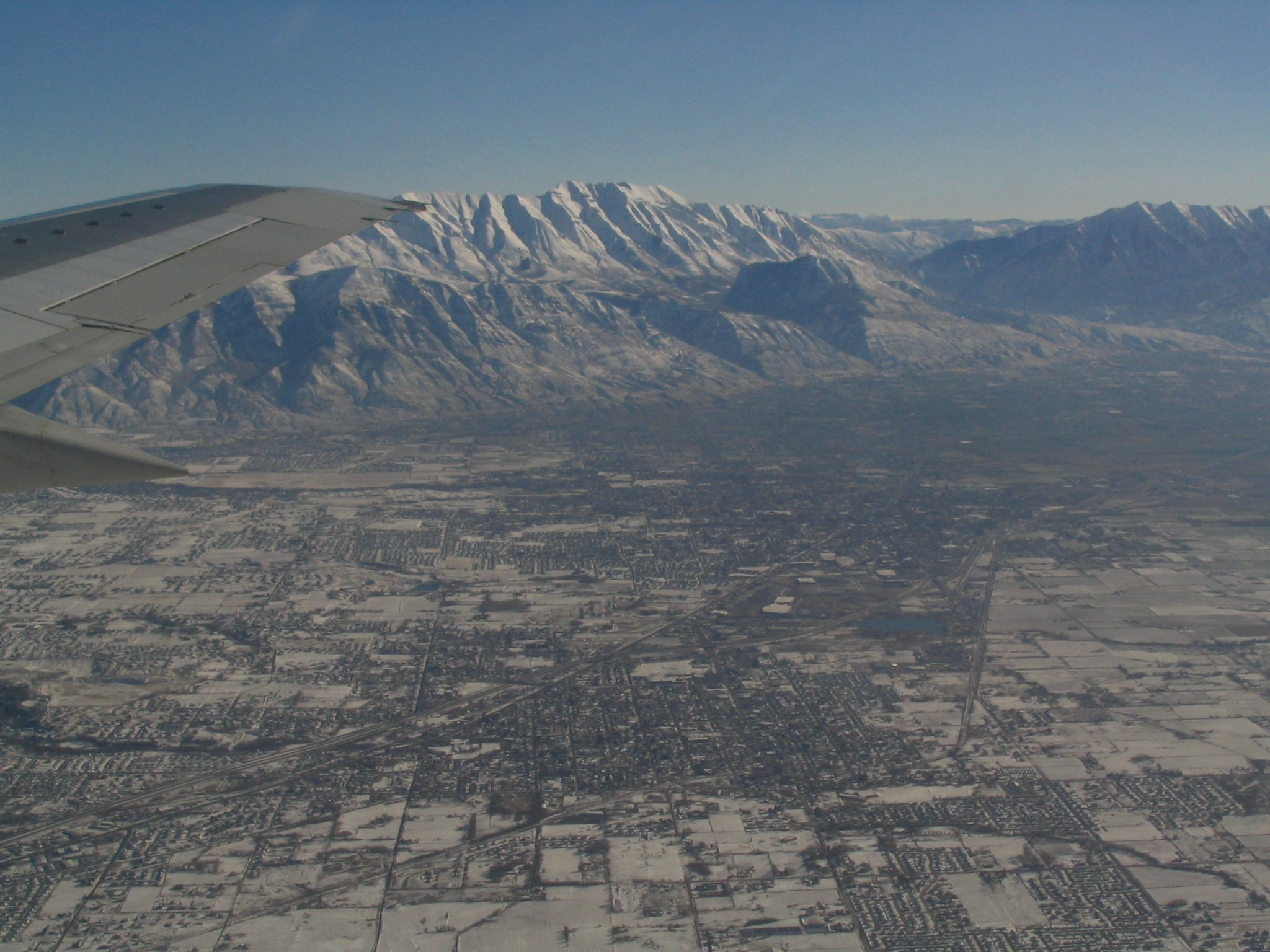
The Utah Valley was where Novell, Caldera, and the Canopy Group were all based, each of which would play a part in the story of The SCO Group, also based there.

The Santa Cruz Operation had been an American software company, founded in 1979 in Santa Cruz, California, that found success during the 1980s and 1990s selling Unix-based operating system products for Intel x86-based server systems. SCO built a large community of value-added resellers that eventually became 15,000 strong and many of its sales of its SCO OpenServer product to small and medium-sized businesses went through those resellers. In 1995, SCO bought the System V Release 4 and UnixWare business from Novell (which had two years earlier acquired the AT&T-offshoot Unix System Laboratories) to improve its technology base. But beginning in the late 1990s, SCO faced increasingly severe competitive pressure, on one side from Microsoft's Windows NT and its successors and on the other side from the free and open source Linux. In 2001, the Santa Cruz Operation sold its rights to Unix and its SCO OpenServer and UnixWare products to Caldera International.

Caldera, based in Orem, Utah, was founded in 1994 by several former Novell employees who saw promise in Linux as a technology and failed to convince Novell management to move forward with it. Caldera's early funding came from Ray Noorda, the former CEO of Novell, and the Utah Valley-based Canopy Group investment fund that Noorda started for high-technology firms. The company had been in the business of selling its Caldera OpenLinux product but had never been profitable. It attempted to make a combined business out of Linux and Unix but failed to make headway and had suffered continuing financial difficulties. By June 2002, after it had moved to nearby Lindon, its stock was facing a second delisting notice from NASDAQ and the company had less than four months' cash for operations. As Wired magazine later wrote, the company "faced a nearly hopeless situation."

On June 27, 2002, Caldera International had a change in management, with Darl McBride, formerly an executive with Novell, FranklinCovey, and several start-ups, taking over as CEO from Caldera co-founder Ransom Love.

=== Back to a SCO name ===
Change under McBride happened quickly. On August 26, 2002, he announced at the company's annual Forum conference – relocated from Santa Cruz to Las Vegas – that Caldera International was changing its name to The SCO Group. He did this via a multimedia display in which an image of Caldera was shattered and replaced by The SCO Group's logo, which was a slightly more stylized version of the old Santa Cruz Operation logo. The attendees at the conference, most of whom were veteran SCO partners and resellers, responded to the announcement with enthusiastic applause. McBride announced, "SCO is back from the dead", and a story in The Register began simply: "SCO lives again." As part of this, the company adopted SCOX as its trading symbol. (Note: The final legal aspects of the name change did not become complete until May 2003.)

The change back to a SCO-based name reflected recognition of the reality that almost all of the company's revenue was coming from Unix, not Linux, products. For instance, McDonald's had recently expanded its usage of OpenServer from 4,000 to 10,000 stores; indeed, both OpenServer and UnixWare were strong in the replicated sites business. Furthermore, the SCO brand was better known than the Caldera one, especially in Europe, and SCO's large, existing reseller and partner channel was resistant to switching to Caldera's product priorities.

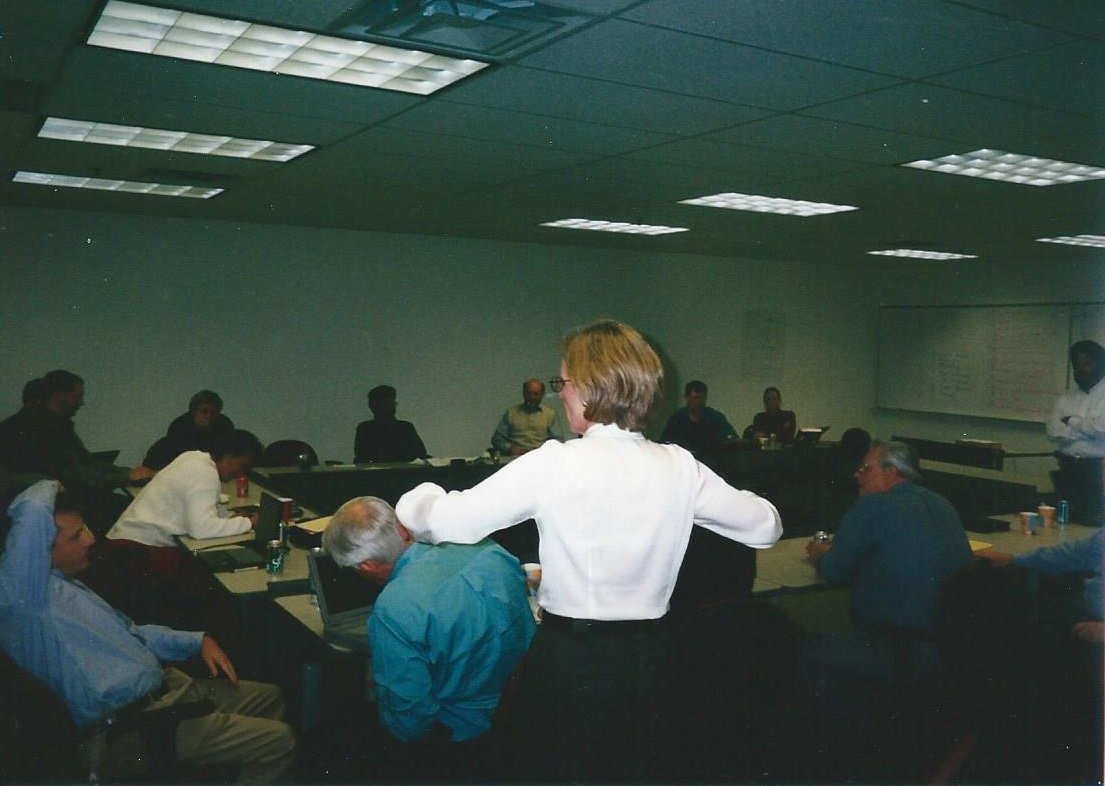
A high-level strategy meeting being held among executives, product managers, and engineering personnel of The SCO Group, in the company's Lindon, Utah offices in December 2002

McBride emphasized that the OpenServer product was still selling: "What is it with the OpenServer phenomenon? We can't kill it. One customer last month bought $4 million in OpenServer licenses. The customers want to give us money for it. Why don't we just sell it?" As a historical comparison for his strategy of building back up the brand and being more responsive to customers, McBride used a model of the revival of the Harley-Davidson brand in the 1980s. Besides McBride, other company executives, including new senior vice president of technology Opinder Bawa, were heavily involved in the change of direction.

The product name Caldera OpenLinux became "SCO Linux powered by UnitedLinux" and all other Caldera branded names were changed as well. In particular, the longstanding UnixWare name – which Caldera had changed to Open UNIX – was restored, such that what had been called Open UNIX 8 was now named in proper sequence as UnixWare 7.1.2. Announcements were made that a new OpenServer release, 5.0.7, and a new UnixWare release, 7.1.3, would appear at the end of the year or beginning of the next. Moreover, through a new program called SCO Update, more frequent updates of capabilities were promised beyond that. Caldera's Volution Messaging Server product was retained and renamed SCOoffice Server, but the other Caldera Volution products were split off under the names Volution Technologies, Center 7, and finally Vintela.

=== Software releases and e-commerce initiatives SCOBiz and SCOx ===
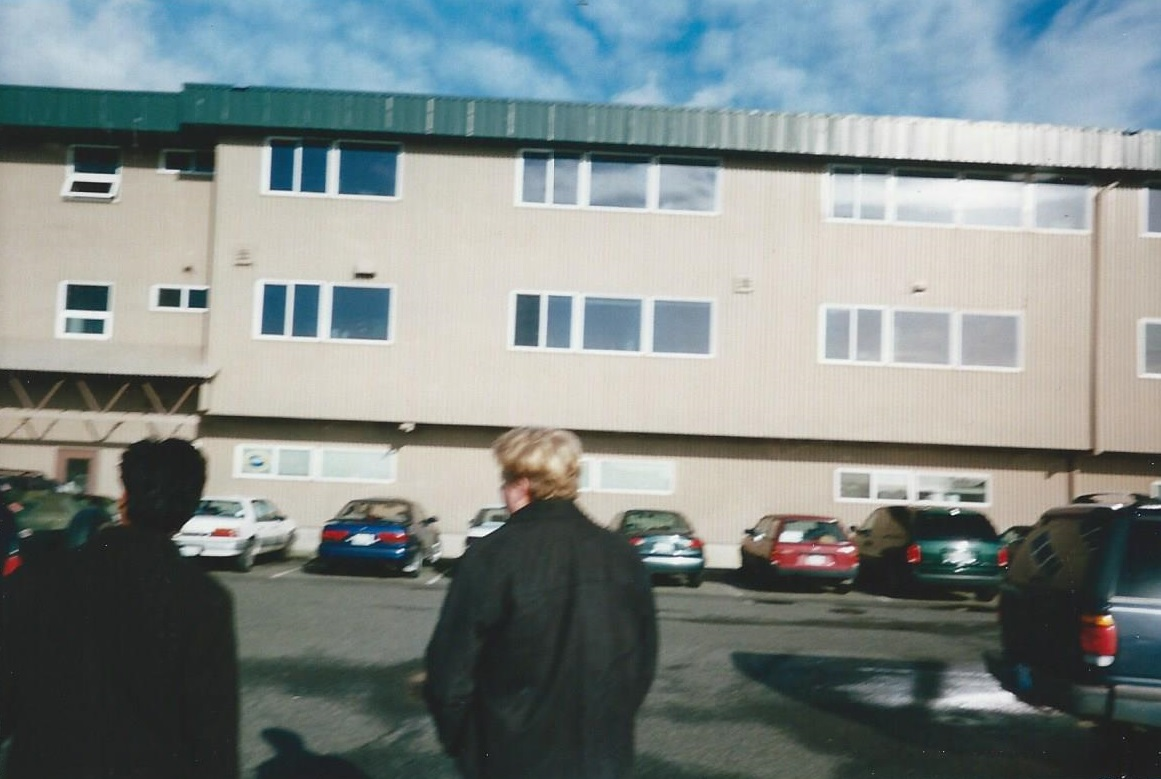
As part of the SCOBiz joint initiative, executives from The SCO Group and Vista.com inspect the latter's data center operations in Bellingham in January 2003.

In addition to reviving SCO's longtime operating system products, the SCO Group also announced a new venture, SCOBiz. SCOBiz was a collaboration with the Bellingham, Washington-based firm Vista.com, founded in 1999 by John Wall, in which SCO partners could sell Vista.com's online, web-based e-commerce development and hosting service targeted at small and medium-sized businesses. More importantly, as part of SCOBiz, the two companies would develop a SOAP- and XML-based web services interface to enable Vista.com e-commerce front-ends to communicate with existing back-end SCO-based applications. Industry analysts were somewhat skeptical of the chances for SCOBiz succeeding, as the market was already crowded with application service provider offerings and the dot-com bubble had already burst by that point.

Lastly, SCO announced a new program for partners, called SCOx. A key feature of SCOx was a buyout option that allowed SCOx solution providers to sell their businesses back to SCO. McBride stated that the program would give partners a chance at "living the American dream".

The company's financial hole was emphasized when it released its results for the fiscal year ending October 31, 2002 – it had lost $25 million on revenues of $64 million.

The previously announced operating system releases began appearing, beginning with a Linux release. Caldera International had been one of the founders of the United Linux initiative, along with SuSE, Conectiva, and Turbolinux, and the newly named SCO Linux 4 came out in November 2002, in conjunction with each of the other vendors releasing their versions of the United Linux 1.0 base. The SCO product was targeted towards the small-to-medium business market, whereas the SuSE product was aimed at the enterprise segment and Conectiva and Turbolinux were intended mostly for the South American and Asian markets. The common United Linux base (which mostly came from a SuSE code origin), and the promise of common certification across all four products, attracted some support from hardware and software vendors such as IBM, HP, Computer Associates, and SAP. An assessment of SCO Linux 4 in eWeek found that it was a capable product, although the Webmin configuration tool was seen as limited when compared to YaST, SuSE's own operating system configuration tool. In terms of service and support, SCO pledged to field a set of escalation engineers that would only be handling SCO Linux issues.

The new Unix operating system releases then came out. UnixWare 7.1.3 was released in December 2002, which featured improved Java support, the Apache Web Server framework, and improvements to the previously developed Linux Kernel Personality (LKP) for running Linux applications. In particular, the SCO Group stated that due to superior multiprocessor performance and reliability, Linux applications could run better on UnixWare via LKP than they could on native Linux itself, a stance that dated back to Santa Cruz Operation/Caldera International days. One review, that found UnixWare 7.1.3 lacking in a number of other respects, called LKP "the most impressive of UnixWare's capabilities". SCO OpenServer 5.0.7 was released in February 2003; the release emphasized enhanced hardware support, including new graphic, network and HBA device drivers, support for USB 2.0, improved and updated UDI support, and support for several new Intel and Intel-compatible processors.

The SCOx software framework was announced in April 2003; its aim was to enable the SCO developer and reseller community to be able to connect web services and web-based presentation layers to the over 4,000 different applications that ran small and midsize businesses and branch offices. The web services aspect of SCOx included bundled SOAP/XML support for the Java, C, C++, PHP, and Perl languages. A primary target of the SCOx framework was SCOBiz e-commerce integration, although other uses were possible as well. The planned SCOx architecture overall was composed of layers for e-business services, web services, SSL-based security, a mySCO reseller portal, hosting services, and a software development kit.

But by then, these software releases and e-commerce initiatives had become overshadowed by legal actions.

== In the courts ==
=== A focus on intellectual property ===
As soon as McBride became the head of Caldera International, he became interested in what intellectual property the company possessed. He had been a manager at Novell in 1993 when Novell had bought Unix System Laboratories, and all of its Unix assets, including copyrights, trademarks, and licensing contracts, for $335 million. Novell had subsequently sold its Unix business to the Santa Cruz Operation, which had then sold it to Caldera. So in 2002, McBride said he had thought: "In theory, there should be some value to that property – somewhere between a million and a billion [dollars], right? I just wanted to know what real, tangible intellectual property value the company held." Shortly before the name change to SCO, Caldera went through its existing license agreements, found some that were not being collected upon, and came to arrangements with those licensees representing some $600,000 in annual revenue.

In particular, from the start of his time as CEO, McBride had considered the possibility of claiming ownership of some of the code within Linux. Outgoing Caldera CEO Ransom Love had told him: "Don't do it. You don't want to take on the entire Linux community." During the August 2002 name change announcement, Bawa stated: "We own the source to UNIX; it's that simple. If we own the source, we are entitled to collect the agreed license fees." But at the time, McBride said he had no intention of taking on Linux.

By October 2002, McBride had created an internal organization "to formalize the licensing of our intellectual property"; this effort was provisionally called SCO Tech. Senior vice president Chris Sontag was put in charge of it.

By the end of 2002, McBride and SCO had sought out the services of David Boies of the law firm Boies, Schiller and Flexner as part of an effort to litigate against what it saw was unrightful use of its intellectual property. Boies had gained fame in the industry for leading the U.S. federal government's successful prosecution of Microsoft in United States v. Microsoft Corp.; as McBride subsequently said: "We went for the biggest gun we could find." (Note: Boies' record in other cases was mixed, however, including a high-visibility loss in the 2000 Bush v. Gore Florida election dispute.)

News of the SCO Group's intent to take action regarding Linux first broke on January 10, 2003, in a column by technology reporter Maureen O'Gara of Linuxgram that appeared in Client Server News and Linux Business Week. She wrote that a draft press release concerning SCO's plans had been in the works for several weeks and had been quietly circulated to other companies in the industry. The O'Gara report, unconfirmed as it was, caused some amount of consternation in the Linux community.

On January 22, 2003, creation of the SCOsource division of the company, to manage the licensing of the company's Unix-related intellectual property, was officially announced, as was the hiring of Boies to investigate and oversee legal protection of that property. As the Wall Street Journal reported, Linux users had generally assumed that Linux was created independently of Unix proprietary code, and Linux advocates were immediately concerned that SCO was going to ask large companies using Linux to pay SCO licensing fees to avoid a lawsuit. The first announced license program within SCOsource was called SCO System V for Linux, which was a set of shared libraries intended to allow SCO Unix programs to be run legally on Linux without a user needing to license all of SCO OpenServer or UnixWare as had theretofore been necessary.

The company continued to lose money, on revenues of $13.5 million in the first fiscal quarter of 2003, but McBride was enthusiastic about the prospects for the new SCOsource division, telling investors on a February 26 earnings call that he expected it to bring in $10 million alone in the second fiscal quarter.

=== Lawsuits begin ===
On March 6, 2003, SCO filed suit against IBM, claiming that the computer giant had misappropriated trade secrets by transferring portions of its Unix-based AIX operating system into Linux, and asked for at least $1 billion in damages. (Note: The amount was subsequently raised to $3 billion, and later still to $5 billion. The suit initially coincided with SCO's existing relationship with IBM to sell UnixWare on IBM Netfinity systems.) The complaint also alleged breach of contract and tortious interference by IBM against the Santa Cruz Operation for its part in the failed Project Monterey of the late 1990s. Overall, SCO maintained that Linux could not have caught up to "Unix performance standards for complete enterprise functionality" so quickly without coordination by a large company, and that this coordination could have happened through the taking of "methods or concepts" even if not a single line of Unix code appeared within Linux. The SCO v. IBM case was underway; it would come to be considered one of the top technology battles of all time.

Many industry analysts were not impressed by the lawsuit, with one saying: "It's a fairly end-of-life move for the stockholders and managers of that company [...] This is a way of salvaging value out of the SCO franchise they can't get by winning in the marketplace." Other analysts pointed to the deep legal resources IBM had for any protracted fight in the courts, but McBride professed to be nonplussed: "If it takes a couple of years, we're geared to do that." For his part, Boies said he liked David versus Goliath struggles, and his firm would see a substantial gain out of any victory.

In mid-May 2003, SCO sent a letter to some 1,500 companies, cautioning them that using Linux could put them in legal jeopardy. As part of this, SCO proclaimed that Linux contained substantial amounts of Unix System V source code and that, as such, "We believe that Linux is, in material part, an unauthorized derivative of Unix." As CNET wrote, the move "dramatically broaden[ed]" the scope of the company's legal actions.

At the same time, SCO announced it would stop selling its own SCO Linux product. A casualty of this stance was SCO's participation in the United Linux effort, and in turn United Linux itself. While the formal announcement that United Linux had ended did not come until January 2004, in reality the project stopped doing any tangible work soon after SCO filed its lawsuit against IBM.

A few days later, Microsoft – which had long expressed disdain for Linux – said that it was acquiring a Unix license from SCO, in order to ensure interoperability with its own products and to ward off any questions about rights. The action was a boon to SCO, which to this point had received little support in the industry for its licensing initiative. Another major computer company, Sun Microsystems, bought an additional level of Unix licensing from SCO to add to what it had originally obtained a decade earlier.

On May 28, 2003, Novell counterattacked, saying its sale of the Unix business to the Santa Cruz Operation back in 1995 did not include the Unix software copyrights, and thus that the SCO Group's legal position was empty. Jack Messman, the CEO of Novell, accused SCO of attempting an extortion plan against Linux users and distributors. Unix has a complex corporate history, with the SCO Group a number of steps removed from the Bell Labs origins of the operating system. Novell and the SCO Group quickly fell into a vocal dispute that revolved around the interpretation of the 1995 asset-transfer agreement between them. That agreement had been uncertain enough at the time that an amendment to it had to be signed in October 1996, and even that was insufficiently unambiguous to now preclude an extended battle between the two companies.

In July 2003, SCO began offering UnixWare licenses for commercial Linux users, stating that "SCO will hold [as] harmless [any] commercial Linux customers that purchase a UnixWare license against any past copyright violations, and for any future use of Linux in a run-only, binary format." The server-based licenses were priced at $699 per machine, and if they were to become mandatory for Linux users, would represent a tremendous source of revenue for SCO. The potential for this happening was certainly beneficial to SCO's stock price, which during one three-week span in May 2003 tripled in value.

Another counterattack came in August 2003, when Red Hat, Inc. v. SCO Group, Inc. was filed by the largest of the Linux distribution companies.

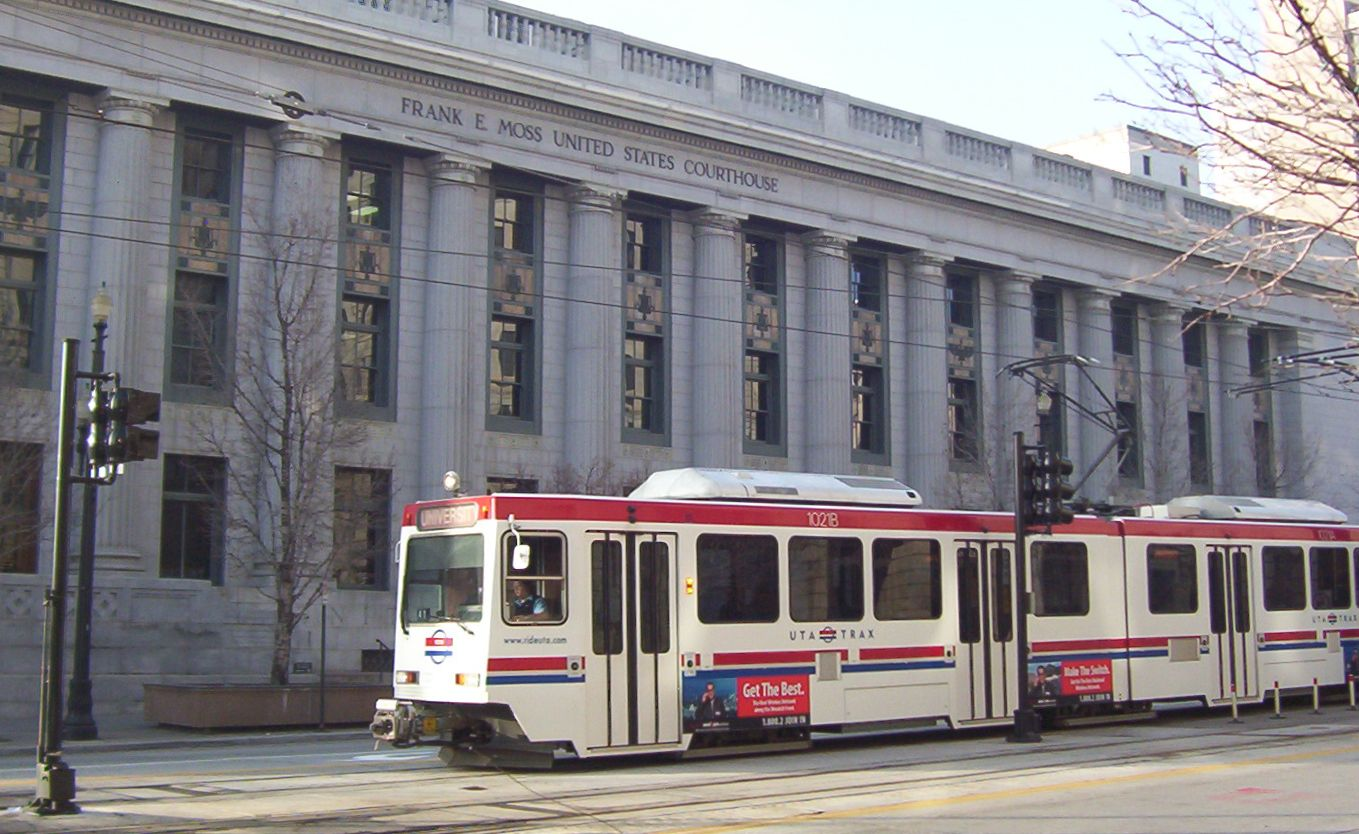
The Frank E. Moss United States Courthouse in downtown Salt Lake City, where many of SCO's legal battles played out, as seen in 2004

The SCO Group received a major boost in October 2003 when BayStar Capital, a technology-focused venture capital firm, made a $50 million private placement investment in SCO, to be used towards the company's legal costs and general product development efforts. In December 2003, SCO sent letters to 1,000 Linux customers that in essence accused them of making illegal use of SCO's intellectual property.

Novell continued to insist that it owned the copyrights to Unix. While Novell no longer had a commercial interest in Unix technology itself, it did want to clear the way for Linux, having recently purchased SuSE Linux, the second largest commercial Linux distribution at the time. On January 20, 2004, the SCO Group filed a slander of title suit against Novell, alleging that Novell had exhibited bad faith in denying SCO's intellectual property rights to Unix and UnixWare and that Novell had made false statements in an effort to persuade companies and organizations not to do business with SCO. The SCO v. Novell court case was underway.

Lawsuits against two Linux end users, SCO Group, Inc. v. DaimlerChrysler Corp. and SCO v. AutoZone were filed on March 3, 2004. The first alleged that Daimler Chrysler had violated the terms of the Unix software agreement it had with SCO, while the second claimed that AutoZone was running versions of Linux that contained unlicensed source code from SCO. As a strategy this move was met by criticism; as Computerworld later sarcastically wrote: "Faced with a skeptical customer base, SCO did what any good business would do to get new customers: sue them for money."

In any case, the stage was set for the next several years' worth of court filings, depositions, hearings, interim rulings, and so on.

=== Vultus acquisition and a change in SCOx ===
The SCOsource division got off to a quick start, bringing in $8.8 million during the company's second fiscal quarter, which led to the SCO Group turning a profit for the first time in its Caldera-origined history.

In July 2003, the SCO Group announced it had acquired Vultus Inc. for an unspecified price. Vultus was a start-up company, also based in Lindon, Utah, and the Lindon-based Canopy Group was a major investor in Vultus just as it was the SCO Group. Vultus made the WebFace Solution Suite, a web-based application development environment with a set of browser-based user interface elements that provided a richer UI functionality without the need for Java applets or other plug-ins. Indeed, in putting together WebFace, Vultus was a pioneer in AJAX techniques before that term was even coined.

The acquisition of Vultus resulted in a shift of emphasis in the company's web services initiative, with an announcement being made in August 2003 at SCO Forum that SCOx would now be a web services-based Application Substrate, featuring a combination of tools and APIs from Vultus's WebFace suite and from Ericom Software's Host Publisher development framework.

A year later, in September 2004, this idea materialized when the SCOx Web Services Substrate (WSS) was released for UnixWare 7.1.4. Its aim was to give existing SCO customers a way to "webify" their applications via Ericom's tool and then make the functionality of those applications available via web services. However, as McBride later conceded, the SCOx WSS failed to gain an audience, and it was largely gone from company mention a year later.

=== Views on infringement claims ===
In the keynote address at its SCO Forum conference in August 2003, held at the MGM Grand Las Vegas, the SCO Group made an expansive defense of its legal actions. Framed by licensed-from-MGM James Bond music and film clips, McBride portrayed SCO as a valiant warrior for the continuance of proprietary software, saying they were in "a huge raging battle around the globe", that the GNU General Public License that Linux was based on was "about destroying value", and saying that like Bond, they would be thrown into many battles but come out the victor in the end.

Linux advocates had repeatedly asked SCO to enumerate and show the specific areas of code in Linux that SCO thought were infringing on Unix. An analyst for IDC said that if SCO were more forthcoming on the details, "the whole discussion might take a different tone." However, SCO was reluctant to show any such code in public, preferring to keep it secret—a strategy that was commonly adopted in intellectual property litigation.

However, during the company's Forum conference, SCO did publicly show several alleged examples of illegal copying of copyright code in Linux. Until that time, these examples had only been available to people who signed a non-disclosure agreement, which had prohibited them from revealing the information shown to them. SCO claimed the infringements were divided into four separate categories: literal copying, obfuscation, derivative works, and non-literal transfers. The example used by SCO to demonstrate literal copying became known as the atemalloc example. While the name of the original contributor was not revealed by SCO, quick analysis of the code in question pointed to SGI. At this time it was also revealed that the code had already been removed from the Linux kernel, because it duplicated already existing functions.

By early 2004, the small amount of evidence that had been presented publicly was viewed as inconclusive by lawyers and software professionals who were not partisan to either side. As Businessweek wrote, "While there are similarities between some code that SCO claims it owns and material in Linux, it's not clear to software experts that there's a violation." The legal considerations involved were complex, and resolved around subtleties such as how the notion of derivative works should be applied. Furthermore, Novell's argument that it had never transferred copyrights to the Santa Cruz Operation placed a cloud over the SCO Group's legal campaign. Most, but not all, industry observers felt that SCO was unlikely to win. InfoWorld drily noted that Las Vegas bookmakers were not giving odds on the battle, but the three analysts it polled gave odds of 6-to-4 against SCO, 200-to-1 against SCO, and 6-to-4 for SCO.

In any case, while Linux customers may not have been happy about the concerns and threats that the SCO Group was raising, it was unclear whether that was slowing their adoption of Linux; some business media reports indicated that it was, or that it might, while others indicated that it was not.

=== "The Most Hated Company in Tech" ===
The stakes were high in the battle the SCO Group had started, involving the future of Unix, Linux, and open source software in general. If SCO were to win its legal battles, the results could be extremely disruptive to the IT industry, especially if SCO's notion of derivative works was to be construed broadly by the courts. Furthermore, a SCO victory would be devastating to the open source movement, especially if the legal validity of the GPL license were to be called into question. Conversely, a clear SCO loss would clarify any intellectual property concerns related to Linux, make corporate IT managers feel more relaxed about adopting Linux as a solution, and potentially bolster corporate enthusiasm for the open source movement as a whole.

There's nothing like a good legal battle to whip up passions, and the SCO Group-versus-the-open-source-world dogfight is no exception. Rhetoric runs high. From the open-source advocates, it's "you're stifling free thought in the name of greed." SCO allies counter with "you're attacking the core values of capitalism."

— LinuxInsider, 2004.

Linux advocates were incensed by SCO's actions, accusing the company of trying to reap financial gain by sowing fear, uncertainty, and doubt (FUD) about Linux within the industry. Linux creator Linus Torvalds said, "I'd dearly love to hear exactly what they think is infringing, but they haven't told anybody. Oh, well. They seem to be more interested in FUD than anything else." Open source advocate Bruce Perens said of SCO, "They don't care who or what they hurt." Industry analyst and open source advocate Gordon Haff said that SCO had thrown a dirty bomb into the Linux user community.

Many Linux enthusiasts approached the issue with a moralistic fervor. By August 2003, McBride said that pickets had been seen at SCO offices. McBride tended to compare Linux to Napster in the music world, a comparison that could be understood by people outside the technology industry. The assault on open source produced intense feelings in people; Ralph Yarro, chairman of SCO and head of the Canopy Group, and the person characterized by some as the mastermind behind SCO v. IBM, reported that back in his home area in Utah, "I have had friends, good friends, tell me they can't believe what we're doing." Internet message boards such as Slashdot saw many outraged postings. The Yahoo! Finance discussion boards, a popular site at the time for investors, were full of messages urging others to sell SCO stock.

SCO suffered a distributed denial-of-service attack against its website in early May 2003, the first of several times the website would be shut down by hackers. One that began in late January 2004 became the most prolonged, when a denial-of-service attack coming out of the Mydoom computer worm prevented access to the sco.com domain for over a month.

The theater of this—it's sort of beyond belief for all of us.

— Darl McBride, 2004.

The general IT industry was not pleased with what SCO was doing either. The September 22, 2003, issue of InfoWorld had a dual-orientation cover that, if read right side up, had a thumbs-up picture with the text "If SCO Loses", and if read upside down, had a thumbs-down picture with the text "If SCO Wins". By February of the following year, Businessweek was headlining that the SCO Group was "The Most Hated Company In Tech". A similar characterization was made by the Robert X. Cringely-bylined column in InfoWorld, which in March 2004 called SCO "the Most Despised Technology Company". The cover of a May 2004 issue of Fortune magazine had a photograph of McBride accompanied by the large text "Corporate Enemy No. 1". SCO's actions in suing Linux end users was especially responsible for some forms of corporate distaste towards it.

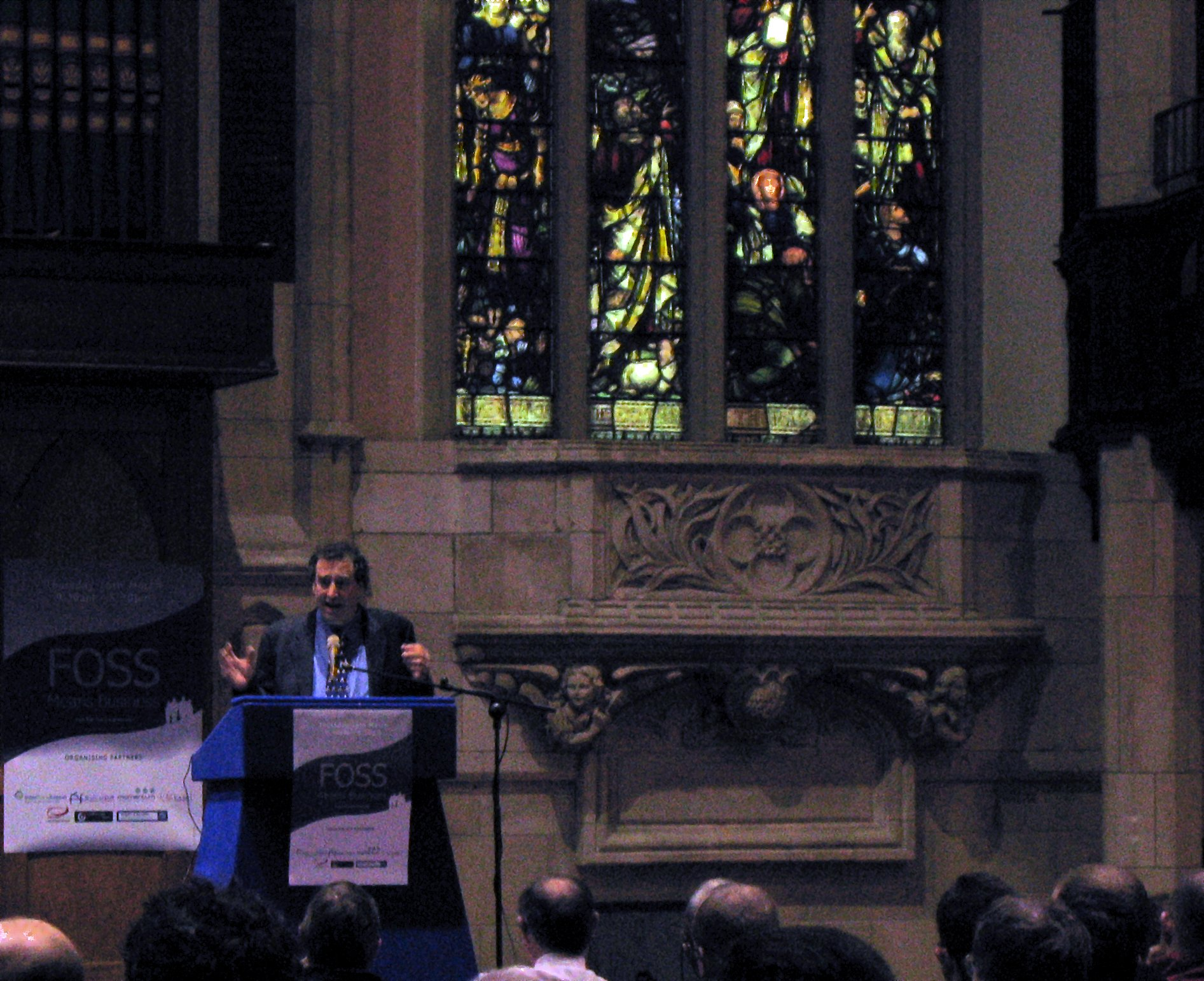
One of the most prominent critics of SCO's actions, Bruce Perens, speaking at a free and open source software conference in 2006

Microsoft, who had previously held that title, had by February 2004 spent a reported $12 million on Unix licenses from SCO. The industry giant said the licenses were taken out as part of normal intellectual property compliance for their Windows Services for UNIX product, which provided a Unix compatibility environment for higher-end Windows systems. Linux advocates, however, saw the move as Microsoft looking for a way to fund SCO's lawsuits in an attempt to damage Linux; indeed, they had seen Microsoft's hand in the SCO Group's actions from almost the beginning; as Bruce Perens wrote in May 2003: "Who really benefits from this mess? Microsoft, whose involvement in getting a defeated Unix company to take on the missionary work of spreading FUD [...] about Linux is finally coming to light." The open source community's antipathy towards Microsoft only increased when it became apparent that Microsoft had played at least some role in introducing the SCO Group to BayStar Capital as a potential investment vehicle (both BayStar and Microsoft said there was no stronger role by Microsoft than that).

The distaste for SCO's actions seeped into evaluations of SCO's product line and technical initiatives as well. Software Development Times acknowledged at one point that "many writers in the tech media, which has a pro-open-source, pro-Linux bias, are subtly or overtly hostile to SCO." As an instance, in July 2003 a columnist for Computerworld examined the SCO Group acquisition of Vultus and concluded that the purpose was not to acquire its technology or staff but rather that Canopy was playing "a shell game [...] to move its companies around" in order to exploit and cash in on the SCO Group's rising stock price. As an analyst for RedMonk stated, "Regardless of the technology they have, there are a lot of enterprises that are going to be ticked off with them. Some of them are receiving these letters (demanding license fees for Linux). There's a perception among companies we've spoken to that SCO is really out to get acquired or to make their money off of licensing schemes rather than technologies. That's an obstacle to adoption of their products." This kind of attitude was exemplified by an apologetic review of UnixWare 7.1.3 in OSNews in December 2003 that acknowledged that SCO had "earned their now nefarious reputation of pure evil" but that "SCO does actually sell a product" and that the reviewer had to assess it objectively.

Another group of people who found the actions of the SCO Group distasteful were some of those familiar with the Santa Cruz Operation, including those who had worked there and those who had written about it; they became protective of that earlier company's reputation, especially given the possible name confusion regarding the two. In an eWeek column entitled "SCO: When Bad Things Happen to Good Brands", technology journalist David Coursey wrote that "SCO was a good company with a good reputation. In some ways, SCO was Linux before Linux, popularizing Unix on low-cost Intel machines [...] It's a good brand name that deserves better, or at least a decent burial and a wake. But instead, its memory is being trashed by people who don't and maybe can't appreciate the fondness many of us still have for the old Santa Cruz Operation." Science fiction author Charles Stross, who had worked as a tech writer in the original SCO's office in England in the early-mid-1990s, called the SCO Group "the brain-eating zombie of the UNIX world" that had done little more than "play merry hell with the Linux community and take a copious metaphorical shit all over my resumé." More simply, former original SCO employee turned journalist and publisher Sara Isenberg, in writing about the history of tech companies in the Santa Cruz area, wrote about The SCO Group, "I'll spare you the sordid legal details, but by then, it was no longer our SCO."

To be sure, not all former original-SCO employees necessarily felt that way. The company still had developers and other staff at the original Santa Cruz location, as well as at the Murray Hill, New Jersey office that dated back not just to the original SCO but to Novell and Unix System Laboratories and AT&T before that. There was also a development office in Delhi, India, as well as regional offices that in many cases came from original SCO. And in 2006, Santa Cruz Operation co-founder Doug Michels made a return to the SCO Forum stage, with McBride presenting him an award for lifetime achievement.

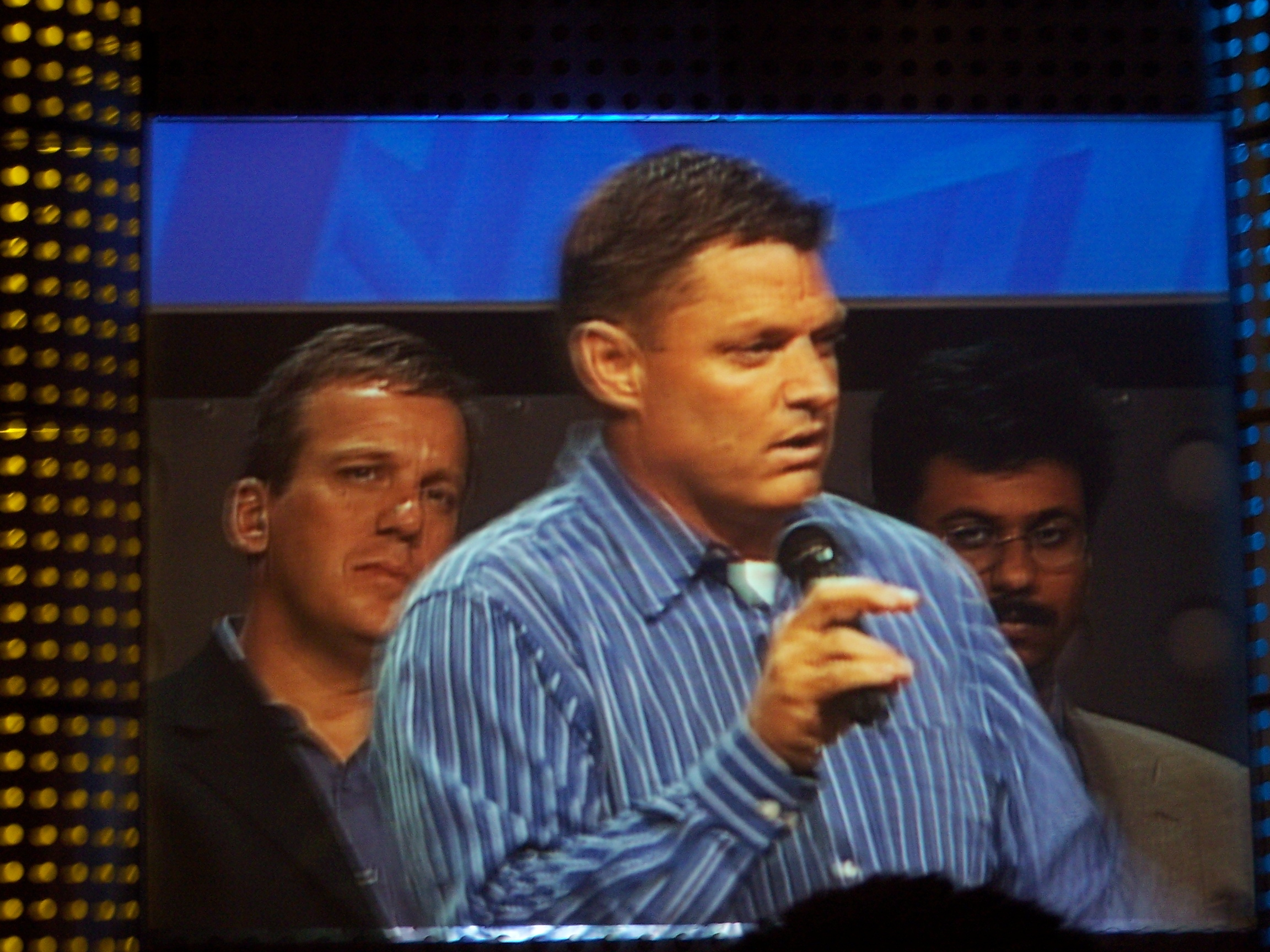
SCO Group CEO Darl McBride speaking at a SCO Forum 2004 keynote session at the MGM Grand in Las Vegas; SCOsource division head Chris Sontag and vice president of engineering Sandy Gupta stand alongside him

A major factor in the SCO–Linux battle was the Groklaw website and its author, paralegal Pamela Jones. The site explained in depth the legal principles and procedures that would be involved in the different court cases—giving technology-oriented readers a level of understanding of legal matters they would otherwise not have—and pulled together in an easily browsed form a massive number of official court documents and filings. Additionally, some Groklaw readers attended the court hearings in person and posted their detailed observations afterward. Accompanying these valuable data points on Groklaw was an interpretative commentary, from both Jones and her readers, that was relentlessly pro-open source and anti-SCO, to the point where journalist Andrew Orlowski of The Register pointed out that Groklaw sometimes suffered badly from an online echo chamber effect. In any case, such was Groklaw's influence that SCO made thinly veiled accusations that Jones was, in fact, working on behest of IBM, something that she categorically denied.

The personification of the SCO–Linux battle was no doubt McBride, who was viewed by many as a villain. Columnist Maureen O'Gara, generally seen as at least somewhat sympathetic to SCO's position, characterized McBride as "the most hated man in the computer industry". McBride acknowledged, "I know people want us to go away, but we are not going to go away. We're going to see this through." The Sunday New York Times business section's "Executive Life" feature ran a self-profile of McBride in February 2004, in which he reflected upon his no-nonsense father raising him on a ranch and the difficulties of being a Mormon missionary in Japan and later a Novell executive there, and concluded, "I am absolutely driven by people saying I can't do something." McBride received death threats serious enough to warrant extra security during his public appearances. Asked in May 2004 to reflect upon what the preceding year had been like, McBride said "This is like ... nothing ... nothing compares to what's happened in the last year."

=== Financial aspects ===
SCO's legal campaign coincided with the best financial results it would have, when in fiscal 2003 they had revenues of $79 million and a profit of $3.4 million. The campaign was also initially very beneficial to its stock price. The stock had been under $1.50 in December 2002 and reached a high of $22.29 during mid-October 2003. In some cases jumps in the price occurred when stock analysts initiated coverage of the stock and gave optimistic price targets for it.

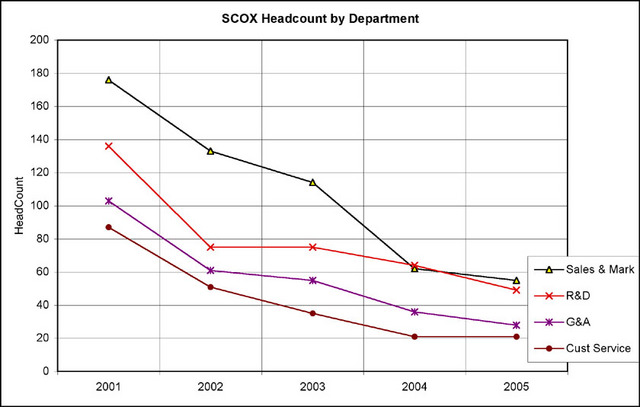
Falling headcounts at the SCO Group, as sourced from official company SEC filings via Yahoo! Finance message boards

But the stock began a downward slide soon after that, and by the end of 2003 about a quarter of all outstanding shares were controlled by short sellers. SCOsource revenue was erratic, with the first half of fiscal 2004 being especially poor. The SCO group had 340 employees worldwide when the lawsuits were first underway in 2003. By a year later, this count had fallen somewhat to 305 employees.

During 2004, SCO and BayStar had a falling out, in part due to the investment firm being unhappy with SCO's constant presence in the headlines and the passionate arguments it was involved in with open source advocates, and in part due to the ongoing expenses of running a struggling software products business. Both BayStar and Royal Bank of Canada, which had been part of the initial placement, bought out of the investment by mid-year. Nevertheless, by the calculation of the Deseret News, SCO had gained a net $37 million out of the arrangement.

Legal actions were a large expense, costing the SCO Group several million dollars each quarter and hurting financial results. For its third quarter of fiscal 2004, for instance, the company reported revenue of $11.2 million and a loss of $7.4 million, of which $7.2 million was legal expenses. To that point, the company had spent a total of some $15 million on such costs. Accordingly, in August 2004, SCO renegotiated its deal with its lawyers to put into place a cap on legal expenses at $31 million, in return for which Boise, Schiller & Flexner would receive a larger share of any eventual settlement.

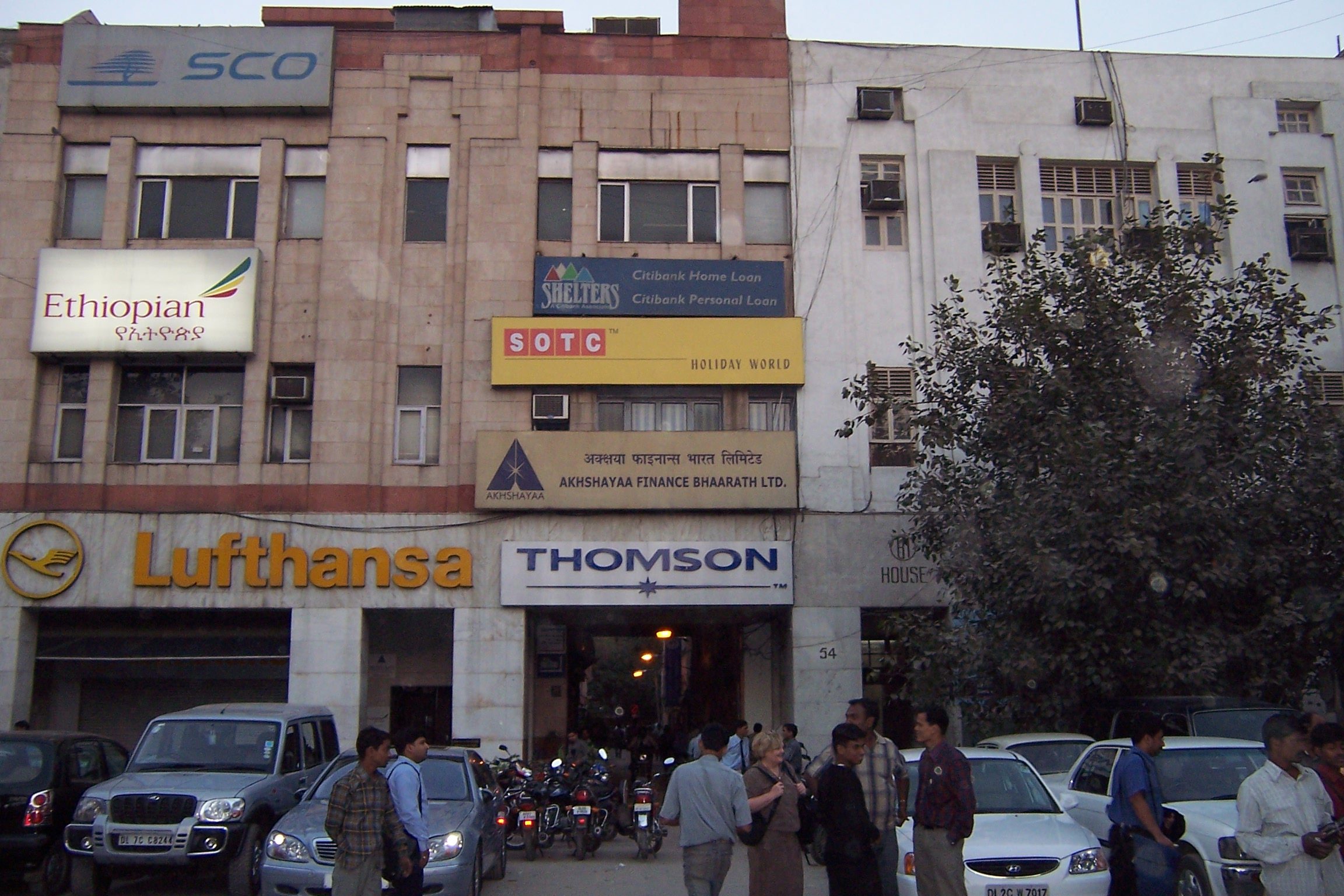
SCO development office in Delhi, as seen in 2006

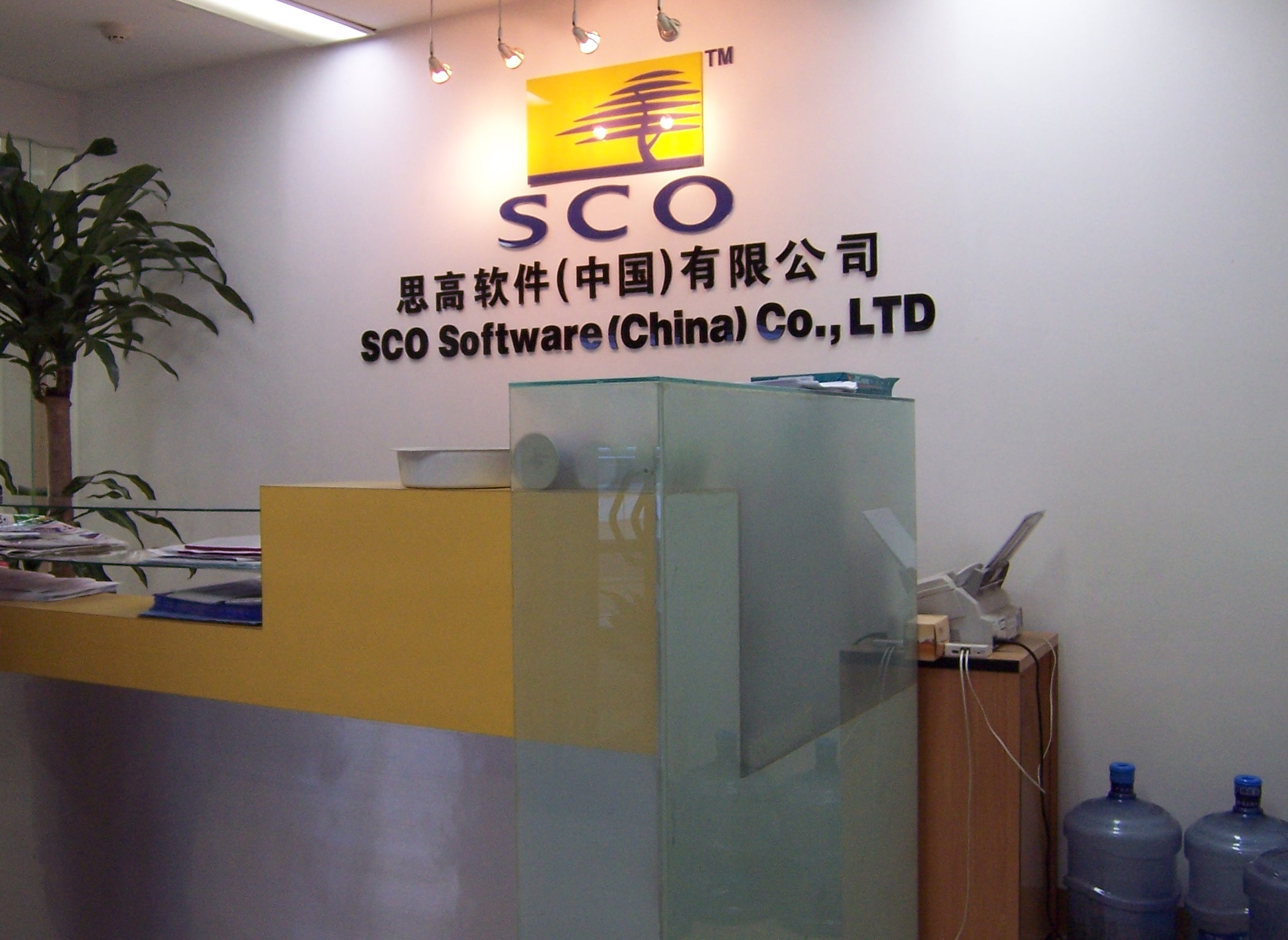
SCO regional office in Beijing, as seen in 2006

McBride continued to come up with new ideas; at the 2004 Forum show he talked about the SCO Marketplace Initiative, which would set up an online exchange where developers could bid on work-for-hire jobs for SCO Unix enhancements that were otherwise not on the SCO product roadmap. Besides helping SCO out, this would set up an alternative to the open source model, one where programmers could "develop-for-fee" rather than "develop-for-free". McBride ultimately envisioned it becoming "an online distribution engine for business applications from a wide variety [of] companies and solution providers." The SCO Marketplace began operation a couple of months later, with jobs posted including the writing of device drivers.

The stock slide continued, and by September 2004 had fallen below the $4 level. The company had some 230 employees worldwide at that point. During the latter portion of 2004, the California office of the company moved out of Santa Cruz proper, as its longtime 400 Encinal Street office building was mostly empty. The thirty employees still remaining took new space on Scotts Valley Drive in nearby Scotts Valley, California.

By early 2005, the SCO Group was in definite financial trouble. Its court case against IBM did not seem to be going well. Sales for fiscal 2004 dropped by 46 percent compared to the year prior, to less than $43 million, and losses rose by a factor of three to over $16 million. Results for the full fiscal 2004 year were bad: revenues dropped by 46 percent compared to the year prior, falling to around $43 million, and there was a loss on that of over $28 million. The company had to restate three of its quarterly earnings statements due to accounting mistakes and was at risk of being delisted by NASDAQ. During the previous year it had laid off around 100 people, constituting a third of its workforce, and by August 2005 the headcount had fallen to under 200.

The company became independent of The Canopy Group in March 2005, after the settlement of a lawsuit between the Noorda family and Yarro. As part of the settlement, Canopy transferred all of its shares in the SCO Group to Yarro.

== Products continue ==
=== Company emphasis ===
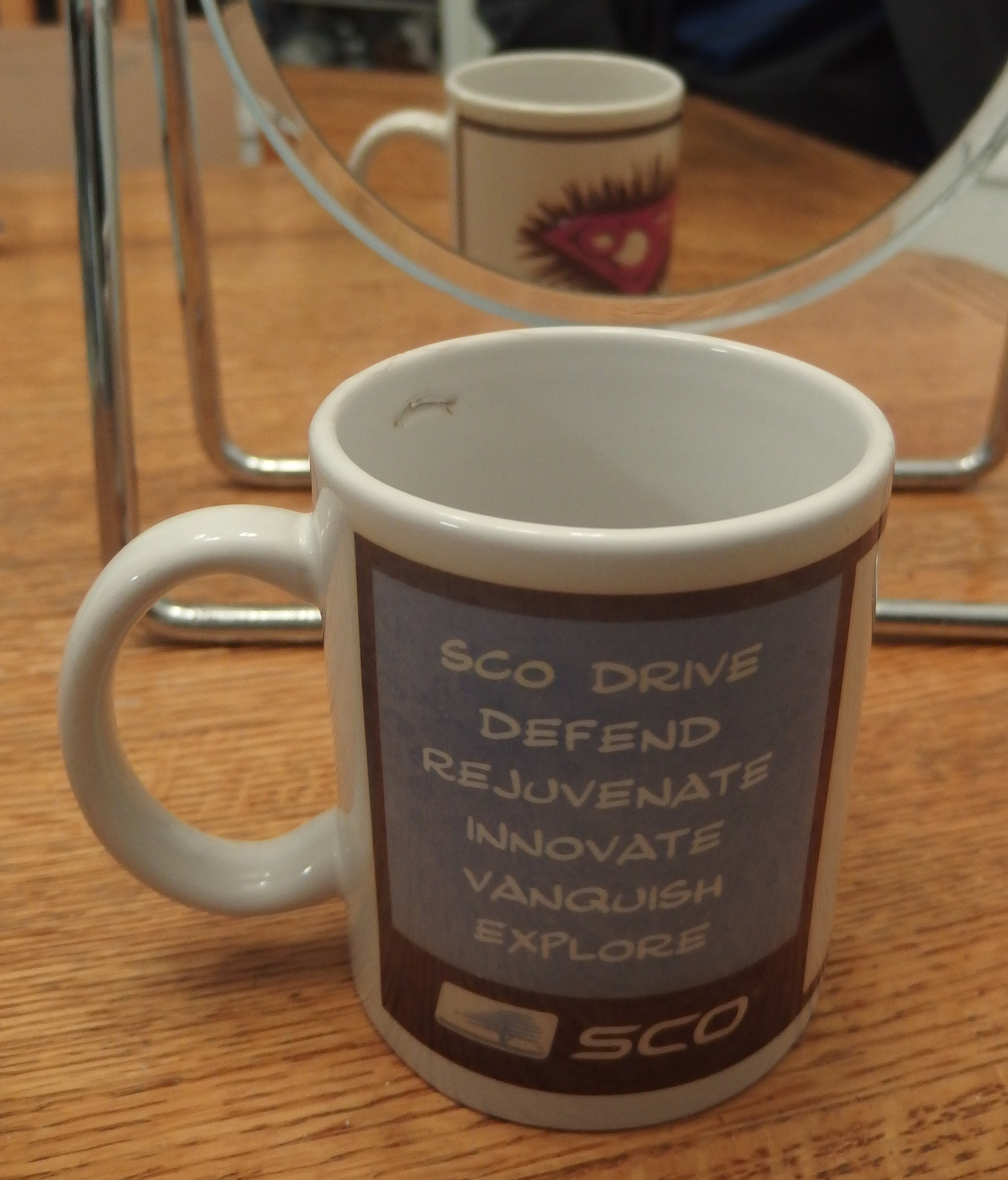
Mug given to SCO Group employees around 2005 to convey the message of the "SCO DRIVE" initiative within the company

While there was an industry impression that the SCO Group was far more focused on lawsuits than bringing forward new and improved products, throughout this period, the large majority of SCO employees were not involved with the legal battle but rather were working on software products. This was a point that McBride never hesitated to point out, for instance saying in August 2005 that the company was spending "98 percent of our resources" on new product development, and only two percent on the active cases in court with AutoZone, IBM, and Novell. The idea of the SCO Group becoming a lawsuits-only company had been proposed by BayStar but it was not something McBride wanted to do. Indeed, McBride expressed at least public optimism that the company could survive on its Unix and other product business even if it lost the court cases.

Nevertheless, there were significant challenges in the product space, as operating system revenue had been falling. SCO still had a market presence in some of its traditional strongholds, such as pharmacy chains and fast-food restaurants. But to some extent, the reliability and stability of products such as OpenServer (and the applications they were typically used for) worked against SCO, as customers did not feel an urgent need to upgrade.

UnixWare 7.1.4 was released in June 2004, with major new features including additional hardware support, improved security, and the abovementioned SCOx web services components. A review in Network World found that the operating system showed strength in terms of server performance and support for Apache and related open source components, but suffered in terms of hardware discovery and ease of installation. The Linux Kernel Personality (LKP), which had earlier been a major selling point of UnixWare 7, was now removed from the product due to the ongoing legal complications. But UnixWare 7.1.4 did come with the OpenServer Kernel Personality (OKP), which allowed OpenServer-built binary applications to run on the more powerful UnixWare platform without modification, and which had earlier been released as an add-on to UnixWare 7.1.3.

SCO announced a Unix roadmap along with the UnixWare release, intending to convince the market that it was making a strong push in software products. Among the items talked about was Smallfoot, a toolkit for developing customized, small-footprint versions of UnixWare for use as an embedded operating system, and an upgrade to the SCOoffice mail and messaging product. But a constant concern was that SCO had difficulty in attracting independent software vendors to support its operating system platform. Perhaps the biggest such hurdle was the lack of support for current versions of the Oracle Database product. Of the problem in general, a manager at a longtime SCO replicated-site customer, Shoppers Drug Mart in Canada, that was migrating to UnixWare 7.1.4 and was otherwise happy with the product's reliability and performance, said: "[Big ISVs] are pushing SCO down to a tier-three vendor. We need a tier-one or a tier-two vendor that will do current ports and certification. We listen to vendors and watch their roadmaps and when SCO disappears that will be a signal [to move on]."

The new SCOoffice release, SCOoffice Server 4.1 for OpenServer 5.0.7, came out in August 2004. SCOoffice consisted of a mixture of proprietary code and open source components and was marketed as a drop-in alternative to Microsoft Exchange Server for small-to-medium businesses, one that would be compatible with Microsoft Outlook (and other common mail clients) but would be less expensive in total cost, be built upon on a more reliable operating system, and have a management interface that could be used by non-technical administrators. Some of the specific technology in the product for interacting with Outlook functions came from Bynari. A review of the SCOoffice technology in PCQuest in 2002 found its ease of installation and features to be good and that it was "a decent package for companies looking for a mail server solution." When originally built by Caldera International, the messaging product had been based on Linux (and UnixWare via LKP), but following the SCO Group's legal actions against Linux it was changed to be based on OpenServer instead, with some disruption to the components that could be included within it. The 4.1 release also contained office collaboration tools for meetings, contacts, and the like. SCOoffice was a consistent product for the SCO Group; at least one, and usually more than one, breakout session about it was held at every Forum conference during the SCO Group era.

=== "Legend" ===
By 2005, more than 60 percent of SCO's revenue was still coming from its OpenServer product line and associated support services. This was despite the fact that there had been no major releases to the product in the time since the Santa Cruz Operation and Caldera Systems had merged in 2000. Accordingly, the SCO Group devoted a large effort, consisting of extensive research and development as well as associated product management activities, into producing the more modern OpenServer Release 6, code-named "Legend". After a couple of slips from announced target dates, it was made generally available in June 2005.

The SCO Group Inc. is in the headlines more often for its legal battles than for its products these days. But last week, the software vendor wrapped up three years of development work and began shipping a major update of its Unix operating system.

— Computerworld on the OpenServer 6 "Legend" release, 2005.

The key idea behind Legend was to transplant the UnixWare SVR5 kernel into the OpenServer everything else. This gave OpenServer 6 the ability to support 1TB file sizes, the lack of which had become a major limitation of OpenServer 5. In addition, OpenServer 6 could support up to 32 processors, up to 64GB of RAM, had various new security capabilities such as SSH, an IPFilter-based firewall, and IPsec for secure VPNs, and had faster throughput for applications which could make use of real multiple threading.

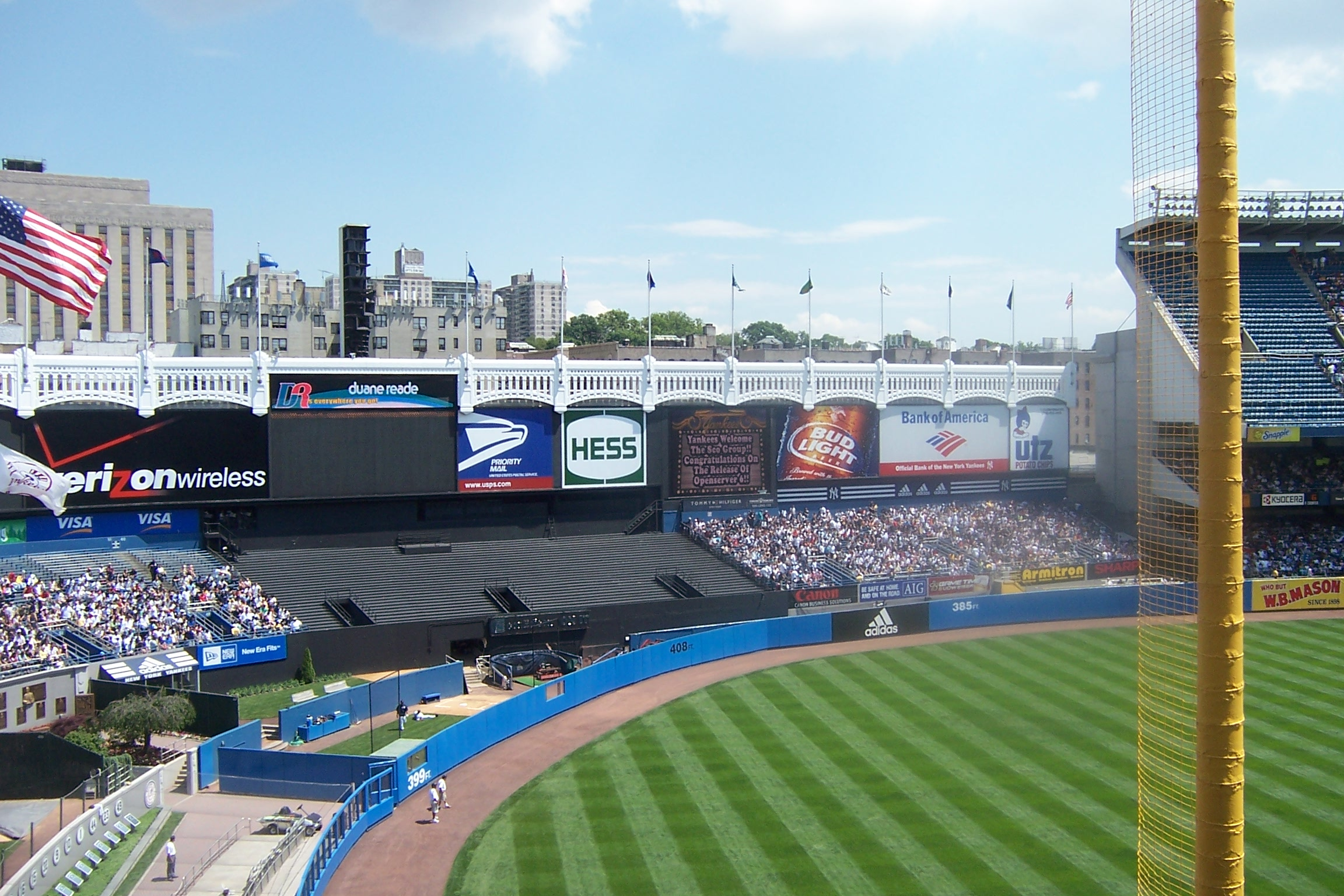
The Yankee Stadium scoreboard has a message of congratulations regarding the release of OpenServer 6 at the launch event held there.

The launch event was held on June 22, 2005, at Yankee Stadium in New York City. (This prompted a few industry publication headlines of the "SCO Goes To Bat With OpenServer 6" variety.) Hewlett-Packard noted its support for OpenServer 6 on its ProLiant systems. Some SCO partners were quoted as saying they intended to migrate to it.

While some analysts, such as those for IDS and Quandt Analytics, expressed the belief that the release could help SCO upgrade and hold onto its existing customer base, an analyst for Illuminata Inc. was not so optimistic, saying, "In a word, no. Looked at in isolation, there's a lot to like about the new OpenServer. It adds a lot of new capabilities and it finally largely merges the OpenServer and UnixWare trees. But OpenServer is in wild decline – the victim of Windows, Linux and years of SCO mismanagement. Today's SCO is a pariah of the IT industry ... OpenServer is a niche product; SCO needs a miracle."

In practice, despite the good reviews it got from a technical perspective, sales of OpenServer 6 were modest. The company continued to do poorly financially, with fiscal 2005 producing revenues of $36 million and a loss on that of almost $11 million, while fiscal 2006 saw revenues of $29 million together with a loss of over $16 million. Reductions in staff continued and the Scotts Valley office was shut down in late 2006.

=== Mobility and Me Inc. ===
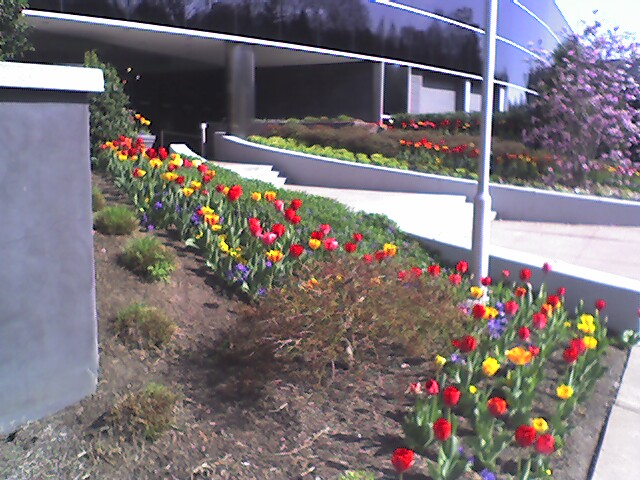
SCO's Murray Hill, New Jersey office building, as taken in 2006 by a Palm Treo 650 smartphone being used for some of the Me Inc. development work being done there

The SCO Group's biggest initiative to find a new software business came with what it called Me Inc., first announced at a DEMO conference in California in September 2005.

Me Inc. sought to capitalize on the emergence of smartphones in that it would provide both mobile apps that would run on the phones and an architecture involving a network "edge processor" that would offload processing and storage from the phones themselves and handle authentication, session management, and aggregation of data requests. In such an approach, Me Inc. represented a hosted software as a service (SaaS) offering, with the edge processor representing what would later become referred to as both edge computing and mobile backend as a service. Some of the engineering effort behind Me Inc. came from former Vultus staff, following the failure of the prior SCOx efforts to find a market. Me Inc. initially targeted the Palm Treo line of smartphones. Subsequent support was put into place for the Windows Mobile line of smartphones and some others.

The first services from Me Inc. were Shout, in which users could broadcast text or voice messages from a phone to large groups; Vote, in which users could post surveys to large groups and quickly receive a tally back; and Action, in which users could post tasks for others to do and monitor their statuses. An early user of the Shout service was Utah State University, which used it for broadcasting messages to members of its sports booster organization. Me Inc. services were subsequently used by other Utah organizations as well, including the Utah Jazz, the BYU Cougars, and Mayor of Provo Lewis Billings.

In February 2006, SCO announced that the edge processor had the product name EdgeClick. The development environment for it was branded the EdgeBuilder SDK. In addition, a website EdgeClickPark.com was announced, that would act as an Internet ecosystem for the development and selling of mobile applications and services. As SCO marketing executive Tim Negris said, the idea of EdgeClickPark was to provide a mechanism for "individuals and organizations of all kinds to participate in developing, selling and using digital services." Many of these services would come not from SCO itself but from SCO partners, resellers, and ISVs, a channel it was familiar with from the original SCO era. This was reminiscent of McBride's goal for the pre-lawsuits SCOBiz and the post-lawsuits SCO Marketplace Initiative, and McBride had similarly large ambitions for Me Inc. and EdgeClickPark, envisioning it having the same role for mobile software that iTunes had at the time for digital music.

McBride, who had been looking at various new business opportunities for SCO to enter, saw the company's mobility initiative as something that could become a big success in both the business and consumer spaces, saying "We don't know for sure, but we have a little bit of a spark in our eyes that this will be a big deal." The SCO Group's chief technology officer, Sandy Gupta, stated that for the company, "this is clearly a big switch in paradigm." Industry analysts thought that Me Inc. was aimed at something there was clearly a large market for. As one said, "The operating system market is an increasingly difficult place to compete. SCO Group really does need more diversity [and] these recent pushes represent significant diversification of their product portfolio." Software Development Times commended SCO for coming up with the EdgeClickPark idea, saying that it showed an "interesting flair" in providing a place for partnerships and business development. The company also undertook the proposing of customized mobile applications for various businesses and organizations, using the Me Inc. platform as a starting point.

However, the SCO Group being able to succeed in these efforts faced somewhat long odds, in part due to their being up against many kinds of competition in the mobile space and in part due to the negative feelings about SCO that their campaign against Linux had engendered. Nevertheless, it was all viewed as a positive development; as Software Development Times summarized in a subheading, "Strategy shift to mobile seen as better 'than suing people'".

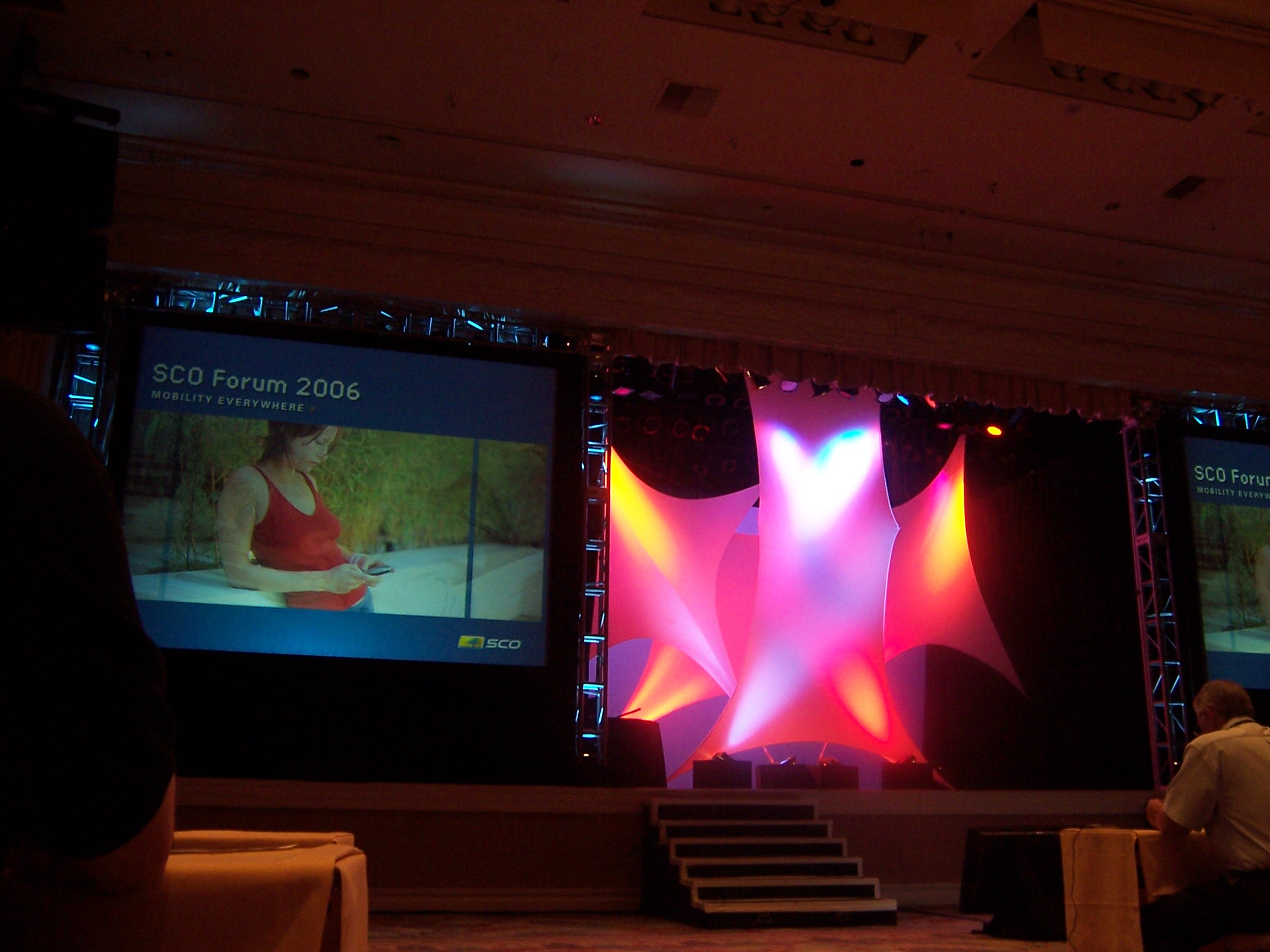
"Mobility Everywhere" was the theme of SCO Forum 2006.

SCO's mobility initiative was a main theme of the 2006 instance of its SCO Forum conference, held at The Mirage in Las Vegas. McBride said, "Today is the coming out party for Me Inc. Over the next few years, we want to be a leading provider of mobile application software to the marketplace. ... This is a seminal moment for us." The Forum 2006 schedule, subtitled "Mobility Everywhere", held some nineteen different breakout and training sessions related to Me Inc. and EdgeClick, compared to twenty-six sessions for operating system related topics. Eager to drum up interest in the EdgeClick infrastructure and to get developers to attend the 2006 instance of SCO Forum, McBride offered a prize to the developer of the best application built from the EdgeBuilder SDK: a 507-horsepower, V10-engined BMW M5 sports sedan.

One new mobility offering, HipCheck, which allowed the remote monitoring and administration of business-critical servers on smartphones, was given its debut announcement and demonstration at Forum. The HipCheck service, which gave system administrators the ability to conduct secure actions from their phone to correct some kinds of server anomalies or respond to user requests such as resetting passwords, was officially made available in October 2006, with support for monitoring agents running on various levels of Windows and Unix systems. Several upgrades to HipCheck were subsequently made available.

Developed by SCO for FranklinCovey, a Utah-based company that had a line of paper-based planning and organizational products, FCmobilelife was an app for handling personal and organizational task and goal management. (In 2006, SCO had been building a similar app for Day-Timer named DT4, but that collaboration fell through.) In particular, the FCmobilelife app emulated FranklinCovey's methodologies for planning and productivity. Initial versions were released for the Windows Mobile and BlackBerry phones; an app for the iPhone was released in mid-2009.

In October 2008, during SCO Tec Forum 2008, the last Forum ever held, the SCO Mobile Server platform was announced, which was a bundling of the Edgeclick server-side functionality and Me Inc. client development kit on top of a UnixWare 7 or Openserver 6 system. By then UnixWare itself, the company's flagship product, had not seen a new release in some four years.

In the end, despite the company's efforts, the mobile services offerings did not attract that much attention or revenues in the marketplace.

== Life in bankruptcy ==
=== An adverse ruling ===
On August 10, 2007, SCO suffered a major adverse ruling in the SCO v. Novell case that rejected SCO's claim of ownership of Unix-related copyrights and undermined much of the rest of its overall legal position. Judge Dale A. Kimball of the United States District Court for the District of Utah issued a 102-page summary judgment which found that Novell, not the SCO Group, was the owner of the Unix copyrights; that Novell could force SCO to drop its copyrights-based claims against IBM; and most immediately from a financial perspective, that SCO owed Novell 95 percent of the revenues generated by the licensing of Unix to companies such as Microsoft and Sun. The only SCO claims left intact by Kimball's judgment were ones against IBM related to contractual provisions from Project Monterey. As the Utah Valley-based Daily Herald newspaper subsequently wrote, Kimball's ruling was "a massive legal setback" for SCO.

An appeal was filed. Meanwhile, the company had few options left, as it had not been doing well anyway – by mid-2007, SCO Group stock had fallen to around $1.56 in value – and it now potentially owed Novell more money than it could pay. On September 14, 2008, the SCO Group filed a voluntary petition for reorganization under Chapter 11 of the United States Bankruptcy Code. Development work continued on both the operating system and mobility fronts, but selling a technology product while in bankruptcy was challenging. And from this point on, many of SCO's actions were dependent upon the approval of the United States Bankruptcy Court for the District of Delaware. Annual results for fiscal 2007 showed yet another decline for the company, with revenues falling to $22 million and a loss of nearly $7 million. And because of the bankruptcy filing, SCO was delisted from NASDAQ on December 27, 2007. Downsizing continued, and the New Jersey development office was moved to smaller space in Florham Park, New Jersey in late 2008.

=== Potential buyers ===
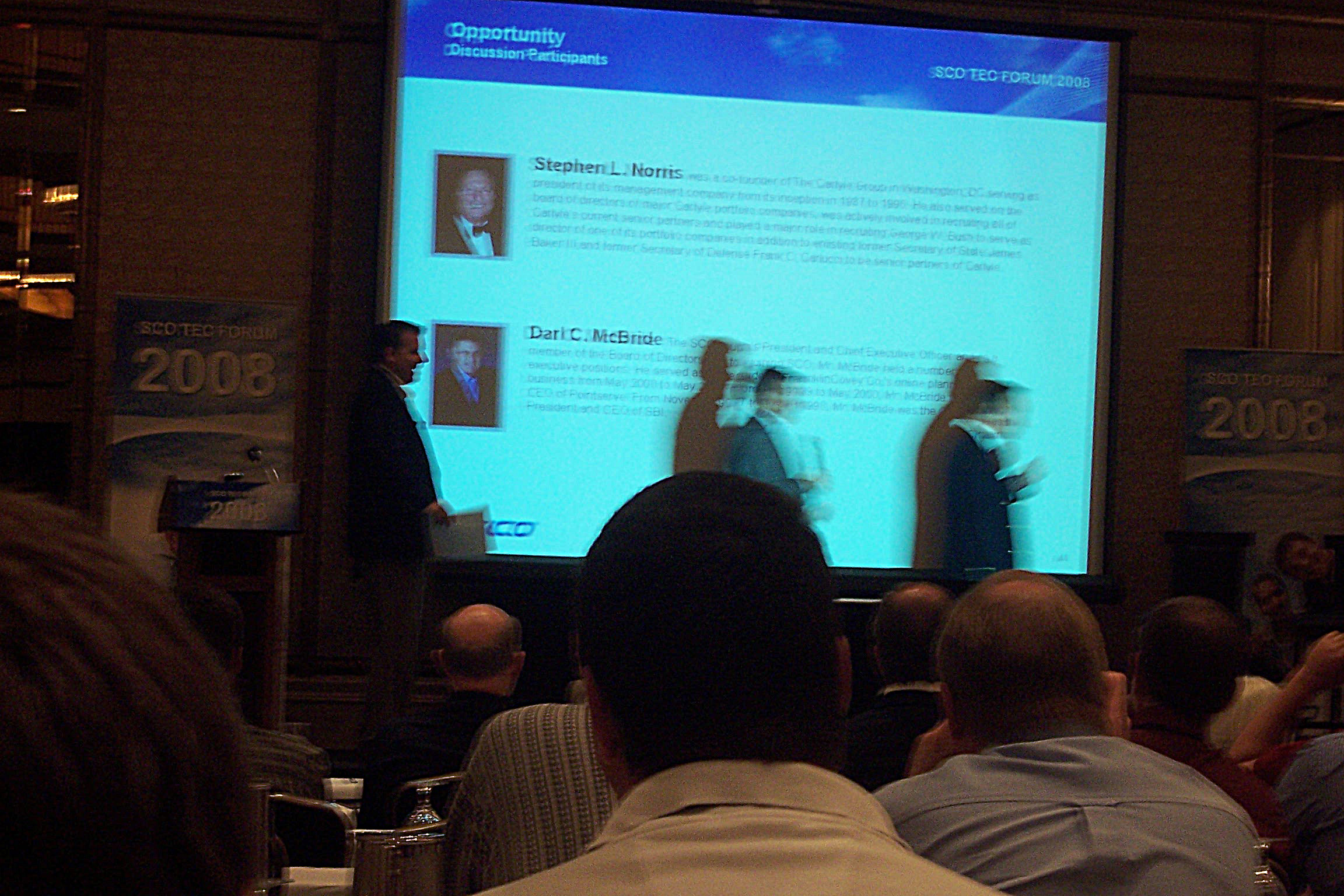
Stephen Norris appearing at the SCO Tec Forum 2008 conference in Las Vegas, along with Darl McBride and Jeff Hunsaker

The interest of Stephen Norris Capital Partners in the SCO Group started in February 2008, when it put forward a $100 million reorganization and debt financing plan for the company, which it would then take private. Stephen L. Norris had been a co-founder of the large and well-known private equity firm The Carlyle Group. There was also an unnamed Middle East partner in the proposed deal; the Associated Press reported that Prince Al-Waleed bin Talal of Saudi Arabia was involved. But after a couple of months of due diligence investigation of SCO's operations, finances, and legal situation, Stephen Norris Capital Partners considered a different course of action, instead proposing to purchase SCO assets outright. Norris appeared on stage at Forum in October 2008, where possible acquisition and investments plans were shown to attendees.

The company continued to have declining financial performance; the yearly results for fiscal 2008 showed revenues falling to $16 million and a loss of $8.7 million. In January 2009, the SCO Group asked the bankruptcy court to approve a plan wherein its Unix and mobility assets would be put up for public auction.

That plan did not materialize, and instead in June 2009 a new proposal emerged from a combination of Gulf Capital Partners, of which Stephen Norris was an investor, and MerchantBridge, a London-based, Middle East-focused private equity group, to create an entity called UnXis, which would then buy SCO's software business assets for $2.4 million. At that point the SCO Group had fewer than 70 employees left. This latest plan, too, did not move forward.

=== Virtualization ===
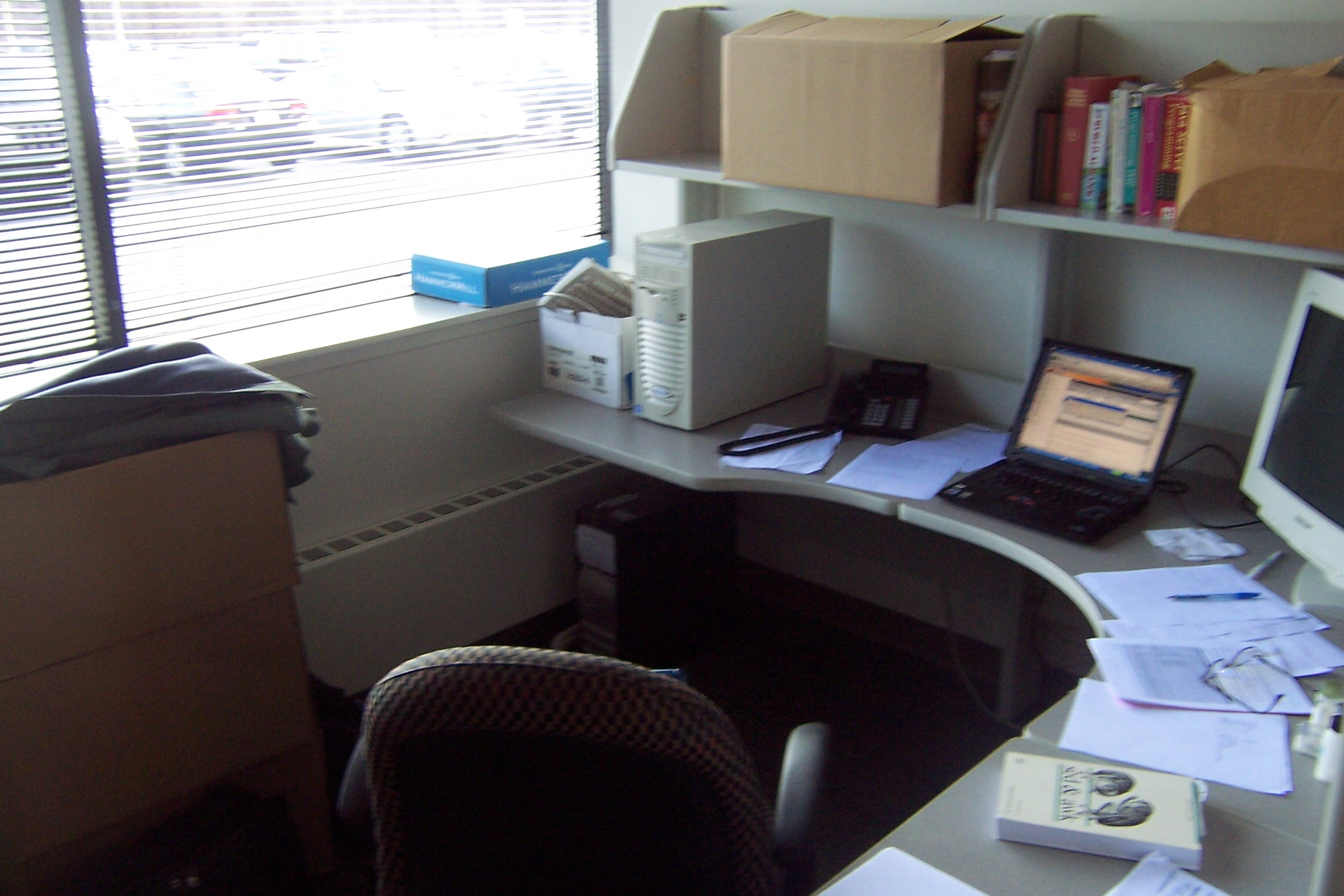
The final offices of the New Jersey Unix work (going back to Bell Labs) was in a small portion of a building in Florham Park, New Jersey, that was used by the SCO Group in the 2008–2011 period.

The SCO Group's last significant engineering effort revolved around capitalizing on a resurgence of industry interest in hardware virtualization. In this case, such virtualization allowed SCO operating systems to run on newer, more powerful hardware even if SCO did not have support or certification for that hardware, and also allowed SCO customers to take advantage of server consolidation and other benefits of a virtual environment. The initial such release, SCO OpenServer 5.0.7V, came out in August 2009, with support for running on VMware ESX/ESXi hypervisors. The technical changes involved included adding enhanced virtual drivers for storage, networking, and peripherals to the operating system as well as tuning its memory management strategies for the virtual environment. The virtualization push also included a change in SCO's licensing infrastructure, wherein now licensing would be done on an annual subscription basis.

The company said it would make similar 'V' releases for UnixWare 7.1.4 and OpenServer 6 in the future, but no such releases took place during the SCO Group's lifetime. However, support for the Microsoft Hyper-V hypervisor for OpenServer 5.0.7V was added in early 2010.

=== Trustee and trial ===
On August 25, 2009, Edward N. Cahn, a former United States district judge of the United States District Court for the Eastern District of Pennsylvania and a counsel for the law firm of Blank Rome, was appointed Chapter 11 trustee for The SCO Group.

In October 2009, a restructuring requested by trustee Cahn led to the termination of McBride and the elimination of the CEO position; the existing COO, Jeff Hunsaker, became the top executive in the company. Perhaps the kindest industry press assessment of McBride's tenure came in a column from Steven J. Vaughan-Nichols in Computerworld, who wrote, "You have to give McBride credit. While I dislike SCO, he did an amazing job of fighting a hopeless battle. It's a pity he was working so hard and so well for such a fundamentally wrong cause."

SCO had appealed the August 2007 summary judgment against it in SCO v. Novell and eventually an appeals court had ruled that a trial had to be held on the issue. A three-week trial was held in March 2010, at the conclusion of which the jury reached a unanimous verdict that the Novell did not transfer the Unix copyrights to the Santa Cruz Operation in 1995. The decision spelled the end for the large majority of the SCO Group's legal offensive, leaving only contractual claims against IBM to possibly still pursue.

=== Sale of assets ===
In April 2010, SCO's mobility software assets were sold to former CEO McBride for $100,000. In September 2010 the SCO Group finally put up the remainder of its non-lawsuit assets for public auction. Thus in February 2011, another proposal was made, this time for $600,000, with this iteration of a purchasing company being backed by Norris, MerchantBridge, and Gerson Global Advisors. The bankruptcy court approved this proposal, as the only other bid submitted was for $18.

The sale was closed on April 11, 2011, with Stephen Norris Capital Partners and MerchantBridge being the final buyers, and UnXis was formed. In particular, UnXis took over the product names, ownership, and maintenance of The SCO Group's flagship operating system products, OpenServer and UnixWare. It also took over some 32,000 service contracts for existing SCO Group customers; these customers represented some 82 countries and business segments such as finance, retail, fast food, and governmental entities. It would be up to UnXis to hire SCO Group employees, of whom, after years of layoffs and attrition, only handfuls were still left at various locations (for instance, at the Lindon, Utah site, only 7 or 8 people still worked, compared with 115 as recently as February 2008).

The SCO Group's litigation rights against IBM and Novell did not transfer, as UnXis said it had no involvement or interest in such activities. What was left of The SCO Group renamed itself to The TSG Group.

== Aftermath ==
=== The TSG Group ===
The TSG Group did not have employees per se; any at the Utah site not hired by UnXis were let go. The jury trial verdict was appealed, but in August 2011 the U.S. 10th Circuit Court of Appeals upheld the verdict and the judge's orders following it, thus bringing to a final end SCO v. Novell.

However, in November 2011 the bankruptcy trustee decided to go on with the surviving contractual claims against IBM, saying that "the Novell ruling does not impact the viability of the estate's claims against IBM." The SCO v. IBM case had previously been closed pending the result of the SCO v. Novell case.

Nonetheless, there was no actual business being conducted by the TSG Group, and in August 2012 they filed to convert their status from Chapter 11 reorganization to Chapter 7 liquidation, stating that "there is no reasonable chance of 'rehabilitation'".

In June 2013, a judge granted the motion of the brankruptcy trustee and reopened consideration of SCO v. IBM. The revived case moved slowly, with a ruling in 2016 being in the favorable direction to IBM, but one in 2017 favorable towards continuing the SCO claims. Industry publications greeted these developments with headlines of the "What is dead may never die" variety.

UnXis changed its name to Xinuos in 2013 and focused on continuing support for UnixWare and OpenServer customers as well as in 2016 releasing OpenServer 10, a FreeBSD-based product that legacy customers could migrate to. By 2022, however, the OpenServer 10 product had been dropped.

McBride turned his purchase of SCO's mobility assets into a company called Shout TV Inc., which was founded in late 2011 and provided social media engagement for sports fans during live events by offering trivia games and prize contests. By 2015, Shout TV had experienced some success, especially in partnership with the Spanish football club Real Madrid. The assets of Shout TV were transferred to a company known as MMA Global Inc. in 2018.

=== Final conclusion of lawsuits ===
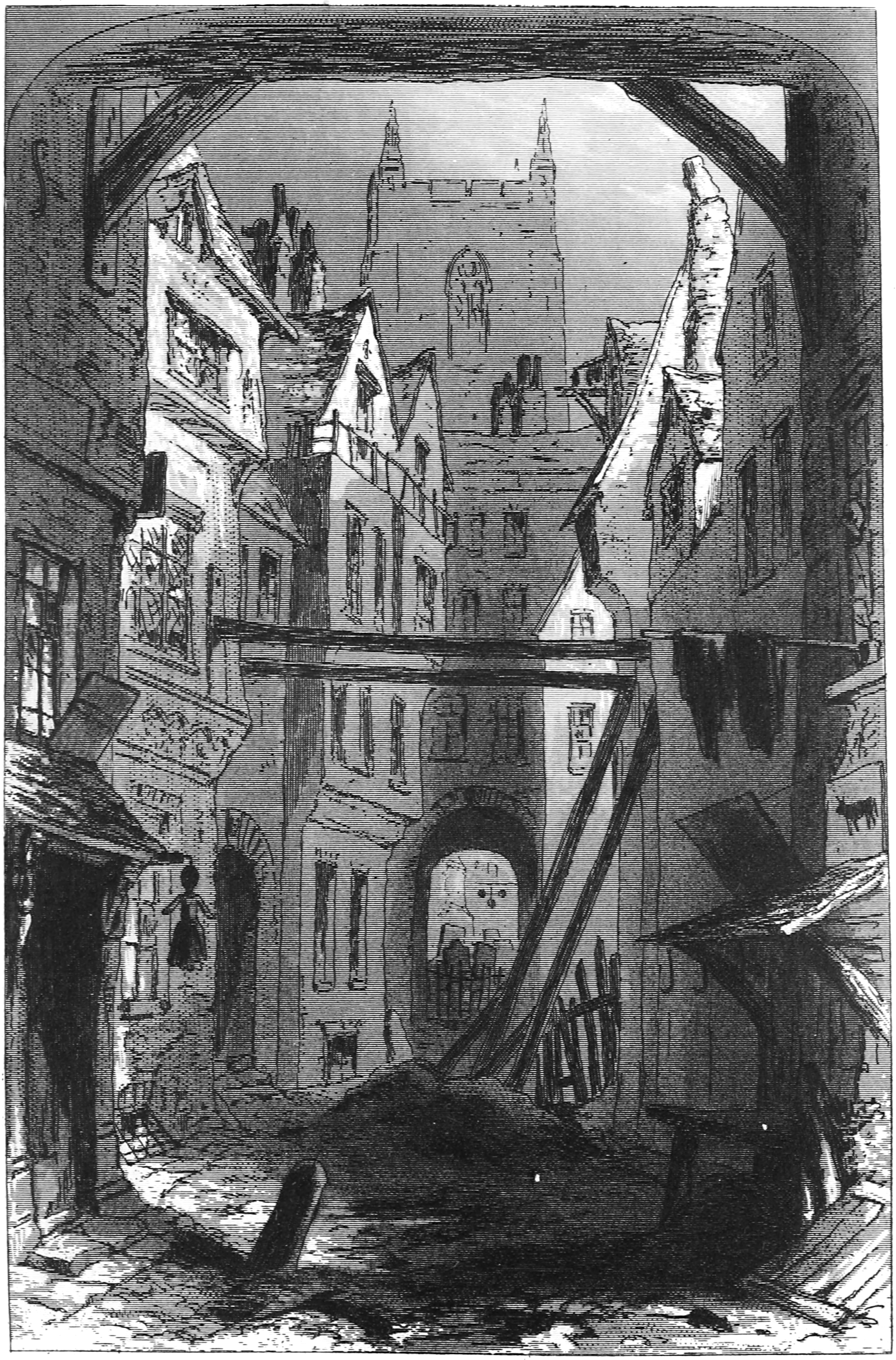
SCO v. IBM only seemed to go on as long as Jarndyce and Jarndyce.

In August 2021, word came of a possible final settlement in the SCO v. IBM case, wherein documents filed in the case indicated that the bankruptcy trustee for TSG Group and IBM appeared to be on the verge of settling the outstanding, Project Monterey-based, claims in the matter for $14.25 million. While the amount was far less than the SCO Group had originally sought when it began the lawsuits, the trustee recommended accepting the settlement, because "ultimate success of the Trustee's claims against IBM is uncertain" and that pursuing the matter further would be expensive and that "the Settlement Agreement provides an immediate and substantial monetary recovery and creates important liquidity for the benefit of all creditors and claimants." As part of this, the trustee would give up any future related claims against IBM. The matter lay with the U.S. Bankruptcy Court for the District of Delaware, which had been handling the case all along.

On November 8, 2021, the settlement was so made under those terms, with IBM paying the TSG bankruptcy trustee $14.25 million and the trustee giving up all future claims and with each party paying their own legal costs. After 18½ years, SCO v. IBM was finally over.

As it happened, by then Xinuos had filed a lawsuit against IBM and Red Hat, reversing direction from its past disavowals of litigation interest, re-alleging old SCO claims about IBM and Project Monterey, and alleging some new claims. Unlike the SCO–Linux battles, however, in this case few people in the industry paid the Xinuos charges much attention, and in the following several years the legal action failed to gain any victories. In any case, the story of The SCO Group was complete.

== Products ==
- SCO UnixWare, a Unix operating system. UnixWare 2.x and below were direct descendants of Unix System V Release 4.2 and was originally developed by AT&T, Univel, Novell and later on The Santa Cruz Operation. UnixWare 7 was sold as a Unix OS combining UnixWare 2 and OpenServer 5 and was based on System V Release 5.
- SCO OpenServer, another Unix operating system, which was originally developed by The Santa Cruz Operation. SCO OpenServer 5 was a descendant of SCO UNIX, which is in turn a descendant of XENIX. OpenServer 6 is, in fact, an OpenServer compatibility environment running on a modern SVR5-based Unix kernel.
- Smallfoot, an operating system and GUI created specifically for point of sale applications.
- SCOBiz, a web-based e-commerce development and hosting site with web services-based integration to existing legacy applications.
- SCOx Web Services Substrate, a web services-based framework for modernizing legacy applications.
- WebFace, a development environment for rich-UI browser-based Internet applications.
- SCOoffice Server, an e-mail and collaboration solution, based on a mixture of open-source and closed-source software.
- SCO Marketplace Initiative, an online exchange offering pay-per-project development opportunities.
- Me, Inc., a mobile services platform with services including Shout, HipCheck, and FCmobilelife.

== List of SCO lawsuits ==
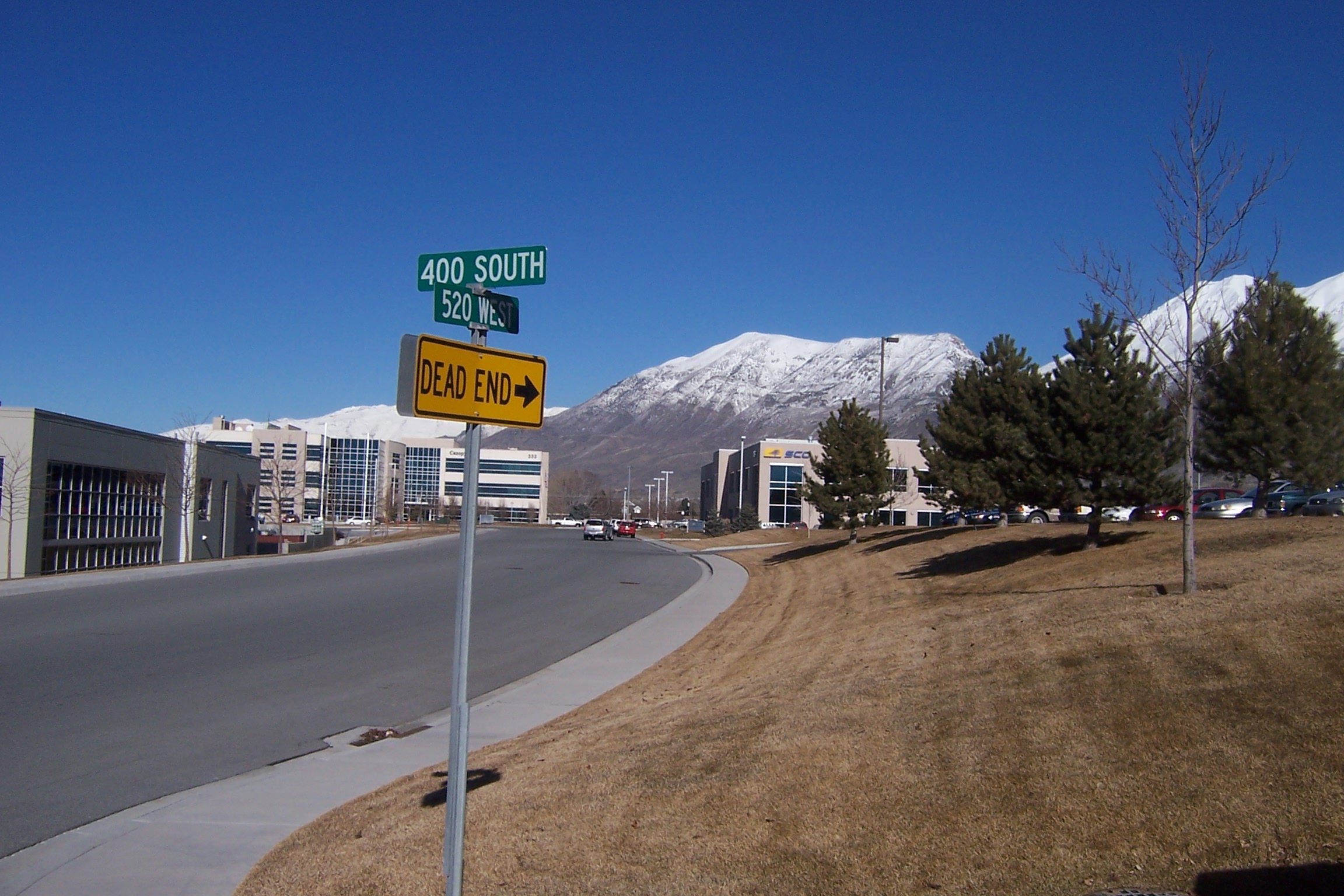

- SCO v. IBM (The SCO Group, Inc. vs. International Business Machines, Inc., case number 2:03cv0294, United States District Court for the District of Utah)
- Red Hat v. SCO
- SCO v. Novell
- SCO v. AutoZone
- SCO v. DaimlerChrysler
