= Symantec Workspace Virtualization =

Application virtualization software

Symantec Workspace Virtualization (abbreviated as SWV) is an application virtualization solution for Microsoft Windows by Symantec, now known as Symantec Endpoint Virtualization Suite (SEVS).

Originally pioneered by Altiris and based on technology acquired from FSLogix and named Software Virtualization Solution, SWV allows applications and data to be put into virtual layers (application layers and data layers) instead of being installed to the base file system and Registry. This is achieved through the use of a filter driver and layering technology Altiris acquired from FSLogix. By placing applications and data into managed layers called Virtual Software Packages (VSP's), SWV allows on-the-fly activation, deactivation, or resetting of applications, to avoid conflicts between applications, and to remove them cleanly without altering the base Windows installation.

Altiris was acquired by Symantec Corporation in 2007, who are the makers of Norton AntiVirus, amongst other things. SWV is available on a trial basis, but must be purchased to enable the full features. SWV is free for private use.

In 2008, Symantec acquired AppStream to incorporate the streaming of virtual applications. According to a quote from DABCC.com, this will "deliver virtualized, on-demand application delivery and management".

Previous names for SWV are the before-mentioned SVS and Software Virtualization Professional.

== See also ==
- Citrix XenApp
- App-V
- VMware ThinApp
