= Timeline of SCO–Linux disputes =

Beginning in 2003, The SCO Group was engaged in a series of disputes with various Linux vendors and users. SCO initiated a series of lawsuits, the most known of which were SCO v. IBM and SCO v. Novell, that had implications upon the futures of both Linux and Unix. SCO claimed that Linux violated some of SCO's intellectual properties. Many industry observers were skeptical of SCO's claims, and they were strongly contested by SCO's opponents in the lawsuits, some of which launched counter-claims. By 2011, the lawsuits fully related to Linux had been lost by SCO or rendered moot and SCO had gone into bankruptcy. However the SCO v. IBM suit continued for another decade, as it included contractual disputes related to both companies' involvement in Project Monterey in addition Linux-related claims. Finally in 2021 a settlement was reached in which IBM paid the bankruptcy trustee representing what remained of SCO the sum of $14.25 million.

== Timeline ==
June 2002
On 27 June 2002, Caldera International has a change in management, with Darl McBride, formerly an executive with Novell, FranklinCovey, and several start-ups, taking over as CEO from Ransom Love. Caldera International had completed its purchase of Unix assets from The Santa Cruz Operation (SCO) the previous year. From the start of his time as CEO, McBride considers the possibility of claiming ownership of some of the code within Linux.
August 2002
On August 26, 2002, Caldera International changes its name back to SCO, in the form of the new name The SCO Group.
October 2002
McBride creates an internal organization "to formalize the licensing of our intellectual property".

January 2003
SCO retains lawyer David Boies, announcing that they would be investigating infringement on their intellectual property pertaining to their ownership of UNIX. Over the next several months, the executives of SCO issue a number of press releases and public statements alleging unspecified violations of their UNIX intellectual property rights in Linux. They also begin to raise questions of the validity of the GPL.
March 2003
In SCO v. IBM, SCO sues IBM over its contributions to Linux, claiming that IBM stole UNIX trade secrets and gave them to Linux kernel developers. The suit was filed originally in the Utah State Court, but was immediately removed to Federal Court.
May 2003
The SCO Group says they sent letters to 1,500 of the world's largest corporations, including the Fortune 500 companies, alleging that the use of Linux may infringe a copyright they hold on the original UNIX source code. They say that the Linux kernel, the core of the operating system contains copyrighted SCO source code. In this letter they also announce the suspension of their own Linux-related activities.
July 2003
The SCO Group files an amended complaint.
August 2003
SCO announces that they intend to issue invoices to companies using Linux.
In Red Hat v. SCO, Red Hat files suit in the United States District Court for the District of Delaware asking for a permanent injunction blocking SCO from asserting that Red Hat infringed on SCO's intellectual property with their Linux product.
IBM files its counterclaims, alleging that SCO has violated the GPL, several patents, and the Lanham Act by falsely accusing IBM of violating SCO's IP rights.
September 2003
SCO CEO, Darl McBride, writes an open letter to the free software community. In this letter he accuses the free software community of being responsible for recent DDoS attacks on the SCO website and once again asserts that Linux violates SCO's intellectual properties.
IBM files amended counterclaims, including a claim of copyright infringement.
October 2003
BayStar Capital and Royal Bank of Canada invest $US50 million in SCO to support the legal cost of the SCOsource program.
SCO announces that it would not attempt invoicing Linux users after being threatened with mail fraud.
December 2003
SCO sends a letter to all Unix licensees asking them to certify certain questions regarding the use of Linux.
SCO sends a letter claiming ownership of the Linux ABI code.

January 2004
SCO sends a letter to the United States Congress, raising issues such as the economics of open source development and the legality of the GPL.
In SCO v. Novell, SCO files slander of title suit against Novell.
February 2004
The SCO Group becomes the target of the Mydoom computer worm, which was programmed to launch a denial of service attack on the company's website beginning on February 1, 2004. The Group has also been the subject of a Google bomb campaign. Google returns SCO's website as the number one hit for the phrase "litigious bastards."
SCO files a second amended complaint against IBM. It drops the trade secret claims, but adds claims of copyright infringement.
March 2004
In SCO v. AutoZone, SCO files suit against AutoZone in Nevada state court.
In SCO v. DaimlerChrysler, SCO files suit against DaimlerChrysler.
IBM files second amended counterclaims.
April 2004
The Red Hat v. SCO case is stayed until resolution of the SCO v. IBM case.
May 2004
IBM files a motion for partial summary judgment on a claim for declaratory judgment of non-infringement. This would confirm that IBM has not infringed on any SRVx code in its Linux activities.
June 2004
Part of the SCO v. Novell case is dismissed due to inadequate pleading of special damages.
July 2004
The SCO v. AutoZone case is stayed pending the outcome in SCO v. IBM.
All claims in the SCO v. DaimlerChrysler case are dismissed except on the matter of breach of section 2.05, in that DC did not submit their response in a timely manner.
SCO files an amended complaint in SCO v. Novell.
August 2004
IBM files motion for partial summary judgment on breach of contract claims in SCO v. IBM. This judgment would confirm that the AT&T license agreement placed no restrictions on derivative works.
IBM files motion for partial summary judgment on its counterclaim for copyright infringement in SCO v. IBM. This judgment would find SCO guilty of copyright infringement of IBM's contributions to Linux.
Randall Davis (MIT) files his second declaration on behalf of IBM. In it, he describes his examination of SCO's claims of infringement, using both the "COMPARATOR" and "SIM" tools. He concluded that, "Despite an extensive review, I could find no source code in any of the IBM Code [including AIX, Dynix, Linux, or JFS] that incorporates any portion of the source code contained in the Unix System V Code or is in any other manner similar to such source code. Accordingly, the IBM Code cannot be said, in my opinion, to be a modification or a derivative work based on Unix System V Code."
Novell files a motion to dismiss.
December 2004
SCO v. DaimlerChrysler case is dismissed without prejudice based on stipulation of the parties. If SCO wished to pursue the remaining claim (i.e. whether DaimlerChrysler replied in a timely manner) again, they would be required to pay DaimlerChrysler's legal fees from August 9, 2004.
SCO appeals to Michigan Court of Appeals.

January, 2005
SCO's appeal of the DaimlerChrysler case is dismissed.
February, 2005
IBM's motions for partial summary judgment are denied without prejudice, to be refiled after the close of discovery.
June 2005
On June 20, expert Brian W. Kernighan filed a declaration on behalf of IBM. He testified that he had performed an analysis of SCO's specific claims and that there was no similarity between the portions of Linux identified by SCO and the allegedly copyrighted works.
July 2005
On July 1, U.S. Federal Judge Dale A. Kimball denied The SCO Group's motion to amend their claim against IBM again (a third amended complaint) and include new claims regarding Monterey on the PowerPC architecture. In the same decision, the five-week jury trial date was set for February 2007.
Novell filed its answer with the court, denying SCO's claims.
Novell filed counterclaims asking the court to force SCO to turn over the revenues it had received from UNIX licenses, less a 5% administrative fee. Additionally, Novell asked the court to place the funds in a "constructive trust" in order to ensure that SCO can pay Novell, since SCO's assets were depleting rapidly.
On July 14, Groklaw obtained an email from Michael Davidson to SCO Group senior vice president Reginald Broughton sent on August 13, 2002. In it, Davidson describes The Santa Cruz Operation's own investigation into whether or not Linux contained proprietary UNIX source code. "At the end, we had found absolutely nothing, i.e., no evidence of any copyright infringement whatsoever", Davidson concluded. At which time SCO presented as evidence an e-mail from a Robert Swartz, a consultant hired by SCO to compare UNIX and Linux source files, that copyright infringement could exist.
December 2005
Final deadline passes in SCO v. IBM to disclose allegedly misused material with specificity. SCO provides IBM with a list of 294 alleged violations.

January 2006
SCO files a second amended complaint against Novell. It adds claims of copyright infringement, unfair competition and breach of a non-compete agreement.
April 2006
SuSE (now owned by Novell) files an arbitration request with the ICC International Court of Arbitration. It asks to preclude SCO from asserting proprietary rights to any code in Linux.
Novell files a motion to stay the case pending the resolution of SuSE arbitration.
May 2006
SCO and IBM exchange initial expert reports.
June 2006
Most of the items on SCO's list of allegedly misused material are stricken by the magistrate judge in SCO v. IBM due to lack of specificity.
November 2006
On November 29, Judge Kimball affirmed Magistrate Judge Brooke Wells' June 28, 2006 Order striking most of SCO's claimed evidence of code misuse as being too vague to be worth adjudicating.
December 2006
On December 1, Wells ruled from the bench in accepting IBM's motion to limit SCO's claims to those supported by evidence submitted by December 22, 2005 and not rejected by the court. SCO stock subsequently lost roughly 50% of its value in three days of exceptionally heavy trading.

April 2007
SCO brings Pamela Jones of Groklaw into both SCO v. IBM and SCO v. Novell cases. They claim that they have attempted to serve Jones although she denies knowledge of any such attempts.
August 2007
On August 10, Judge Dale Kimball issued a ruling in SCO v. Novell which found that "Novell is the owner of the UNIX and UnixWare copyrights" and SCO to be in breach of its SVRX licensing agreement with Novell. The ruling also cast further doubt on SCO's claims that IBM and Linux infringe against any SCO source code, and upheld Novell's right to force SCO to waive its copyright claims against IBM and Sequent. In response, on Monday, August 13, SCO stock fell over 70%, to 44 cents a share.
September 2007
The trial in SCO v. Novell was due to start on Monday September 17, in order to determine how much money SCO owed Novell. On September 14, SCO Group filed a voluntary petition for reorganization under Chapter 11 of the United States Bankruptcy Code. As a result of the petition for bankruptcy, all pending litigation was automatically stayed as per U.S.C. § 362. On September 27, NASDAQ issued SCO a notice of potential delisting, under their discretionary authority. SCO appealed this decision, but on September 19, it received another delisting warning for an insufficient bid price. On October 23, SCO announced that they had reached an agreement with York Capital Management. Pending Bankruptcy Court approval, York was to purchase most of SCO's business for a total of approximately $36 million, including financing. After Novell, IBM, and the United States Trustee objected to the deal, SCO withdrew the proposed sale on November 20, without prejudice.
November 2007
Novell succeeded in getting a court to lift SCO's Chapter 11 immunity from legal action and will continue with legal action against SCO.
December 2007
SCO stock is delisted from the NASDAQ stock exchange.

July 2008
Novell granted award of 2.5 million against SCO.

August 2009
On August 24, the United States Court of Appeals for the Tenth Circuit partially reverses summary judgment in SCO v. Novell, deciding that an issue of fact was present that should have been reserved for a trial. It affirmed the judgment on royalties due, while reversing the summary judgments on ownership of UNIX and UnixWare copyrights, SCO's claim seeking specific performance, the scope of Novell's rights under Section 4.16 of the APA, and the application of the covenant of good faith and fair dealing to Novell's rights under Section 4.16 of the APA. The reversed judgments were remanded to trial.
October 2009
On October 14, 2009, SCO Group announced that the company had terminated CEO Darl McBride's contract.

March 2010
The SCO Group's case against Novell for slander of title is heard by a jury in Utah, which ruled in favor of Novell. The jury determines that the Unix copyrights never transferred to SCO. A lawyer for SCO responds that the court still needed to rule on whether Novell had the right to waive SCO's claims against IBM in a related suit and whether Novell is obligated by the sales contract to transfer the copyright to SCO. And SCO decides to continue the lawsuit against IBM for causing a decline in SCO revenues.
May 2010
Remaining issues in SCO v. Novell settled by the District Court in favor of Novell and against SCO.
June 2010
Judge Ted Stewart decides that SCO is obligated to recognize Novell's waiver of SCO's purported claims against IBM and Sequent. The Court also judges in favor of Novell and against SCO on SCO's claim for breach of the implied covenant of good faith and fair dealing, ordering the case to be closed.
December 2010
SCO files an appeal of SCO v. Novell, scheduled to be heard on January 20, 2011.

April 2011
Having sold off its operating assets other than the lawsuits, The SCO Group, Inc. then renames itself TSG Group, Inc.
August 2011
On August 30, 2011, the United States Court of Appeals for the Tenth Circuit affirms SCO's loss to Novell in the second jury/bench trial. SCO's appellate brief had argued that there were evidentiary errors and other issues at trial. The affirmed verdict held that Novell did not transfer the UNIX copyrights to SCO in the amended asset purchase agreement, and that Novell has the right to waive certain alleged license violations.

August 2012
TSG Group, Inc. files to convert from Chapter 11 bankruptcy protection to Chapter 7 liquidation stating "There is no reasonable chance of rehabilitation" and that it is looking to reduce bankruptcy costs on itself while continuing to pursue the SCO v. IBM suit.

June 2013
On June 14, 2013, Judge David Nuffer rules on SCO v. IBM motions, granting SCO's motion for reconsideration and reopening the case.

June 2015
Magistrate Judge Paul M. Warner was added to the case, to oversee settlement discussions.

February 2016
On February 26, 2016, SCO and IBM filed a joint motion for final entry of judgement against SCO. This enables SCO, if it wishes, to appeal the partial summary judgements in favor of IBM. Due to its bankruptcy, its only remaining asset is its right to appeal the failure of its legal claims against IBM.

October 2017
On October 30, 2017, the United States Court of Appeals for the Tenth Circuit issues a ruling partially in favor of the SCO Group, saying that SCO's claims that, as part of Project Monterey, IBM misappropriated SCO's proprietary code in relation a "sham" version of Monterrey for IBM AIX for PowerPC, could go forward. The case is remanded to Judge Nuffer in U.S. federal court.

February 2018
SCO and IBM restate their remaining claims before Judge Nuffer and discuss a plan to move toward final judgement.

May 2020
Magistrate Judge Warner was no longer assigned to overseeing settlement discussions.

March 2021
On March 31, 2021 Xinuos, Inc., the company that develops and markets the Unix-based OS's previously maintained by SCO, filed a copyright infringement and antitrust lawsuit against International Business Machines Corp. and Red Hat, Inc. in the United States District Court of the Virgin Islands, St. Thomas and St. John Division alleging that IBM and Red Hat, using wrongfully copied software code, have engaged in additional, illegal anti-competitive misconduct to corner the billion-dollar market for Unix and Linux server operating systems. IBM rejected the claims as "without merit" and "defying logic".

August 2021
Word came of a possible final settlement in the SCO v. IBM case, wherein documents filed in the case indicated that the bankruptcy trustee for TSG Group and IBM appeared to be on the verge of settling the outstanding, Project Monterey-based, claims in the matter for $14.25 million. As part of this, the trustee would give up any future related claims against IBM.

November 2021
The settlement was made under those terms, with IBM paying the TSG bankruptcy trustee $14.25 million and the trustee giving up all future claims and with each party paying their own legal costs.

== See also ==
- SCO–Linux disputes
- SCO v. IBM
- SCO v. DaimlerChrysler
- SCO v. AutoZone
- SCO v. Novell
- Red Hat v. SCO
- Xinuos
