= SCOsource =

Business division of The SCO Group

SCOsource is a business division of The SCO Group that managed its (now legally voided) Unix intellectual property. The term SCOsource is often used for SCO's licensing program that allowed corporate users of Linux to buy licenses to proprietary Unix technology that SCO claimed exists in the Linux operating system. A single CPU license costs US$699.

On July 21, 2003, SCO announced that it intended to sell binary-only licences to use the free Linux operating system which would remove the threat of litigation from licence-holders. Linux advocates reacted by stating that SCO had no basis for this action, as their claims were still disputed in court, and that the terms of the GPL seemed to indicate that doing this may cause SCO to forfeit their rights to distribute Linux or Linux-derived code in any form.

== EV1Servers.net ==
On March 1, 2004, SCO announced it had reached a license agreement with EV1Servers.net. SCO's Blake Stowell claimed the deal was worth upward of "seven figures", while a few days later EV1Servers CEO Robert Marsh claimed the amount was much lower. EV1 faced backlash from its Linux users for accepting the agreement, and Marsh stated later that month that he regretted the deal. One analyst noted that SCO "[h]aving their first publicly announced customer express second thoughts over the deal so soon after its announcement may make it difficult [...] to sign up other customers".

== Computer Associates ==
On February 4, 2004, during discovery of the SCO v. IBM case, SCO attorney Mark J. Heise sent a letter answering some questions raised by IBM's attorneys. In this letter, published on Groklaw on February 10, 2004, Heise revealed that Computer Associates bought a Linux intellectual property license from SCO.

On March 6, 2004, Network Computing likewise published an article in which it said: "Computer Associates, a major corporate backer and user of Linux, signed a SCOsource license last August as part of a $40 million settlement between CA, the Canopy Group and Center 7". Sam Greenblatt, senior vice president and chief architect of the Linux technology group at CA, further added that "CA's license for Linux technology is part of a larger settlement with the Canopy Group. It has nothing to do with SCO's strategy of intimidation."

Computer Associates later denied buying licenses from SCO:

CA senior VP of product development Mark Barrenechea says that Bench's claim is nonsense. CA has not paid SCO any Linux taxes, he said. Drawing up short of calling SCO a liar, Barrenechea claims that SCO has twisted a $40 million breach-of-contract settlement that CA paid last summer to the Canopy Group, SCO's biggest stockholder, and Center 7, another Canopy company, and has turned it into a purported Linux license.

As a 'small part' of that settlement, Barrenechea said, CA got a bunch of UnixWare licenses that it needed to support its UnixWare customers. SCO, he said, had just attached a transparent Linux indemnification to all UnixWare licenses and that is how SCO comes off calling CA a Linux licensee.

== Revenue ==
In October 2004, SCO Group's CEO Darl McBride would admit that, after initial deals with Microsoft and Sun Microsystems brought in $8.3 million in the second quarter of fiscal 2003, revenue from SCOsource would drop to $7.3 million in the third quarter and $10.3 million in the fourth. Revenue from SCOsource then plummeted to $20,000 in the first quarter of 2004, followed by $11,000 in the second quarter and $678,000 in the third quarter.

In June 2007, SCO revealed that quarterly revenue from SCOsource in the 2004–2005 period averaged $20,000 to $35,000. The company's financial results indicate that SCOsource has generated a total of $27.5 million between 2003 and 2007, at a cost of $55.2 million.

== See also ==
- SCO–Linux disputes
- Groklaw
