= SCO–Linux disputes =

Legal and public disputes between a software company and Linux vendors and users

In a series of legal disputes between SCO Group and Linux vendors and users, SCO alleged that its license agreements with IBM meant that source code IBM wrote and donated to be incorporated into Linux was added in violation of SCO's contractual rights. Members of the Linux community disagreed with SCO's claims; IBM, Novell, and Red Hat filed claims against SCO.

On August 10, 2007, a federal district court judge in SCO v. Novell ruled on summary judgment that Novell, not the SCO Group, was the rightful owner of the copyrights covering the Unix operating system. The court also ruled that "SCO is obligated to recognize Novell's waiver of SCO's claims against IBM and Sequent". After the ruling, Novell announced they had no interest in suing people over Unix and stated "We don't believe there is Unix in Linux". The final district court ruling, on November 20, 2008, affirmed the summary judgment, and added interest payments and a constructive trust.

On August 24, 2009, the U.S. Court of Appeals for the Tenth Circuit partially reversed the district court judgment. The appeals court remanded back to trial on the issues of copyright ownership and Novell's contractual waiver rights. The court upheld the $2,547,817 award granted to Novell for the 2003 Sun agreement.

On March 30, 2010, following a jury trial, Novell, and not The SCO Group, was unanimously found to be the owner of the UNIX and UnixWare copyrights. The SCO Group, through bankruptcy trustee Edward Cahn, decided to continue the lawsuit against IBM for causing a decline in SCO revenues.

On March 1, 2016, SCO's lawsuit against IBM was dismissed with prejudice; SCO filed an appeal later that month. The case was finally settled in 2021.

== Overview ==
Unix is a major computer operating system, developed in the United States of America. Prior to the events of this case, the intellectual property rights (IP) in Unix were held by Unix System Laboratories (USL), part of AT&T, but the area of IP ownership was complex. By 2003, the rights in Unix had been transferred several times and there was dispute as to the correct owner in law. Also, some of the code within Unix had been written prior to the Copyright Act of 1976, or was developed by third parties, or was developed or licensed under different licenses existing at the time. The software company SCO Group (SCO), formerly Caldera International, asserted in 2003 that it was the owner of Unix, and that other Unix-type operating systems—particularly the free operating system Linux and other variants of Unix sold by competitor companies—were violating their intellectual property by using Unix code without a license in their works.

SCO initially claimed, and tried to assert, a legal means to litigate directly against all end-users of these operating systems, as well as the companies or groups providing them—potentially a very substantial case and one that would throw fear into the market about using them. It was unable to formulate such a case, however, because the Unix copyrights were weakly worded, there was no basis in patent law, and breach of trade secrets would only affect the one or few companies who might have been alleged to have disclosed trade secrets. Lacking grounds to sue all users generally, SCO dropped this aspect of its cases.

The assertions were heavily contested. Claims of SCO's own copyright violations of these other systems were raised, along with claims related to SCO being bound by, or violating, the GPL licence, under which SCO conducted business related to these systems. Claims were also made that the case was substantially financed and promoted by Microsoft and investment businesses with links to Microsoft; around that time (1998–2004 onwards), Microsoft was fiercely engaged in various FUD tactics such as its Get the facts campaign, that sought to undermine or discredit Linux as a possible competitor to its own Windows operating systems and server systems.

In the end, SCO launched only a few main legal cases—against IBM for improper disclosure and breach of copyright related to its AIX operating system, against Novell for interference (clouding the issue of ownership), against DaimlerChrysler for non-compliance with a demand to certify certain matters related to Unix usage, and against Linux business and former client AutoZone for violating SCO's rights by using Linux. Separately, the Linux company Red Hat also filed a legal claim against SCO for making false claims that affected its (Red Hat's) business, and to seek a court declaration that SCO had no ownership rights in Linux code.

In 2007, a court ruled in SCO v. Novell that Novell and not SCO was the owner of the Unix copyrights. As of 2016, most of these cases have been resolved, or largely resolved, and none of the rulings have been in SCO's favor.

== Timeline and major cases ==
At the beginning of 2003, SCO claimed that there had been "misappropriation of its UNIX System V code into Linux". The company refused to identify the specific segments of code, claiming that it was a secret that they would reveal only to the court. They did say that the code could be found in the SMP, RCU and a few other parts of the Linux kernel.

On 6 March 2003, they announced that they were suing IBM for $1 billion, claiming that IBM transferred SCO trade secrets into Linux. That amount later rose to $3 billion, and then again to $5 billion. Later that year in May 2003, Novell stated publicly that it owned the AT&T Unix intellectual property that SCO claimed IBM violated, a statement confirmed by a jury trial in 2007, and that demolished SCO's infringement suit.

Some educated parties noted that the USL v. BSDi case had shown that the Unix copyrights are weak and unenforceable. SCO did not claim patent infringement, as according to the US Patent and Trademark Office database, no AT&T or Novell patent was ever assigned to SCO. The UNIX trademark was not owned by SCO. That left arguing over trade secrets, which, after some opposition, proved hard to take beyond a breach of contract between SCO and IBM, and consequentially, a claim only against IBM.

That left SCO with little legal ground, and therefore it began multiple legal claims and threats against a number of the major names in the computer industry, including IBM, Hewlett-Packard, Microsoft, Novell, Silicon Graphics, Sun Microsystems and Red Hat.

By mid-2004, five major lawsuits had been filed:

- SCO v. IBM
- Red Hat v. SCO
- SCO v. Novell (not directly related to Linux, the suit has more to do with Unix copyrights)
- SCO v. DaimlerChrysler
- SCO v. AutoZone

In multiple initial court filings, SCO publicly implied that a number of other parties have committed copyright infringement, including not only Linux developers, but also Linux users.

== UNIX SVRx ==
SCO's claims were derived from several contracts that SCO asserted transferred UNIX System V Release 4 intellectual property assets. The UNIX IP rights originated with Unix System Laboratories (USL), a division of AT&T. In 1993, USL sold all UNIX rights and assets to Novell, including copyrights, trademarks, and active licensing contracts. Some of these rights and assets, plus additional assets derived from Novell's development work, were then sold to the Santa Cruz Operation in 1995. The Santa Cruz Operation had developed and was selling a PC-based UNIX until 2000, when it then resold its UNIX assets to Caldera Systems, which later reorganized into Caldera International and changed its name to SCO Group.

Through this chain of sales, SCO claimed to be the "owner of UNIX". The validity of the claims was immediately and hotly contested by others. SCO claimed copyright to all UNIX code developed by USL, referred to as SVRx, and licensing contracts originating with AT&T, saying that those were inherited through the same chain of sales. The primary document SCO presented as evidence of these claims was the "Asset Purchase Agreement", defining the sale between Novell and the Santa Cruz Operation. SCO claimed that the sale included all copyrights to the UNIX code base and contractual rights to the licensing base. The other parties disagreed.

=== UNIX copyrights ownership ===
Arguably, the status of copyrights from some of the assets of the USL was murky, since UNIX code is a compilation of elements with different copyright histories. Some code was released without copyright notice before the Copyright Act of 1976 made copyright automatic. This code may be in the public domain and not subject to copyright claims. Other code was affected by the USL v. BSDi case, and is covered by the BSD License.

Groklaw uncovered an old settlement made between Unix System Laboratories (USL) and The University of California in the case of USL v. BSDi. This settlement ended a copyright infringement suit against the university for making BSD source code freely available that USL felt infringed their copyrights. The university filed a counter suit, saying that USL had taken BSD source code and put it in UNIX without properly acknowledging the university's copyright. This settlement muddied the question of SCO's ownership of major parts of the UNIX source code. This uncertainty was helpful in SCO's attempts to cast doubt on Linux, which did use some BSD code.

Novell challenged, ultimately successfully, SCO's interpretation of the purchase agreement. In response to a letter SCO sent to 1500 companies on May 12, 2003, Novell exchanged a series of letters with SCO beginning in May 2003, stating that the copyrights for the core UNIX System V were not included in the asset purchase agreement and were retained by Novell. In October 2003, Novell registered those copyrights with the US Copyright Office.

In response to these challenges from Novell, SCO filed a "slander of title" suit against Novell, SCO v. Novell. SCO claimed that Novell was interfering with their business activities by clouding the ownership of UNIX copyrights (that is, SCO claimed Novell was doing what SCO was actually doing). SCO's claim for special damages was dismissed on June 9, 2004, for "failure to specifically plead special damages." SCO was given 30 days "to amend its complaint to more specifically plead special damages". In the same ruling, the judge stated that it was questionable whether or not the Asset Purchase Agreement transferred the relevant copyrights, reasoning that the ASA amendment by which SCO was claiming to have acquired those rights contained no transfer language in the form of "seller hereby conveys to buyer" and that it used ambiguous language when it came to the question of when and how and which rights were to be transferred.

SCO filed an amended complaint. In late July, 2005, Novell filed an answer to SCO's complaint, denying all of its accusations. Novell also filed its own Slander of Title counter-lawsuit against SCO, along with claims for multiple breaches of the APA (Asset Purchase Agreement) between Novell and the Santa Cruz Operation. Under the APA, Santa Cruz (and later SCO after SCO purchased Santa Cruz Operation's Unix Business) was given the right to market and sell Unixware as a product, retaining 100% of all revenues. Santa Cruz Operation (and later SCO) also was given the responsibility of administering Unix SVR4 license agreements on behalf of Novell. When money was paid for licensing, SCO was required to turn over 100% of the revenue to Novell, and then Novell would return 5% as an Administration Fee. Novell stated that SCO signed Unix SVR4 licensing agreements with Microsoft and Sun Microsystems, as well as with multiple Linux End Users for Unix IP allegedly in the Linux Kernel, and then refused to turn the money over to Novell. Novell sought 100% of the revenue, and further stated SCO was not entitled to the 5% administration fee since they breached their contract with Novell. Novell's counterclaims asked the court to put appropriate funds from SCO into escrow until the case was resolved, since SCO's cash was diminishing quickly.

Novell had also retained the right to audit SCO's Unix Licensing Business under the APA. Novell stated that SCO failed to turned over vital information about the Microsoft, Sun, and Linux End User License Agreements, despite repeated demands by Novell for them to do so. Novell asked the court to compel SCO to allow Novell to perform an audit of SCO's Unix Business.

On August 10, 2007, Judge Dale Kimball, hearing the SCO v. Novell case, ruled that "the court concludes that Novell is the owner of the UNIX and UnixWare Copyrights".

=== License administration standing ===
The Novell to Santa Cruz Operation Asset Purchase Agreement also involved the administration of some 6000 standing licensing agreements between various UNIX users and the previous owners. The licensees included universities, software corporations and computer hardware companies. SCO's claimed ownership of the licenses became an issue in three aspects of the SCO–Linux controversies. The first was the cancellation of IBM's license, the second was SCO's complaint against DaimlerChrysler (see SCO v. DaimlerChrysler), and the third is the derivative works claim of the SCO v. IBM case.

In May 2003, SCO canceled IBM's SVRx license to its version of UNIX, AIX. This was based on SCO's claim of unrestricted ownership of the System V licensing contracts inherited from USL. IBM ignored the license cancellation, claiming that an amendment to the original license made it "irrevocable". In addition, as part of the Purchase Agreement, Novell retained certain rights of control over the administration of the licenses that were sold, including rights to act on SCO's behalf in some cases. Novell exercised one of these rights by revoking SCO's cancellation of the IBM license. SCO disputed the validity of both of these actions, and amended its SCO v. IBM complaint to include copyright infringement, based on IBM's continued sale and use of AIX without a valid SVRx license.

In December 2003, SCO demanded that all UNIX licensees certify some items, some related to the use of Linux, that were not provided for in the license agreement language. Since DaimlerChrysler failed to respond, SCO filed the SCO v. DaimlerChrysler suit in March 2004. All of SCO's claims related to the certification demands were summarily dismissed by the court.

=== Control of derivative works ===
The third issue based on the UNIX licensees agreement is related to SCO's claims of control of derivative works.

Many UNIX licensees have added features to the core UNIX SVRx system and those new features contain computer code not in the original SVRx code base. In most cases, software copyright is owned by the person or company that develops the code. SCO, however, claimed that the original licensing agreements define this new code as a derivative work. They also claimed that they have the right to control and restrict the use and distribution of that new code.

These claims were the basis of SCO v. IBM. SCO's initial complaint said that IBM violated the original licensing agreement by not maintaining confidentiality with the new code, developed and copyrighted by IBM, and releasing it to the Linux project.

IBM replied that the license agreement (noted in the $Echo newsletter of April 1985) and subsequent licenses defined derivative works as the developer's property. That left IBM free to do as it wished with its new code. In August 2004, IBM filed a motion for partial summary judgment. The motion stated that IBM had the right to do as it wished with software not part of the original SVRx code. In February 2005, the motion was dismissed as premature, because discovery was not yet complete. IBM refiled this motion along with other summary judgment motions as noted below in September 2006.

=== SCO allegations of copyright and trade secret violations ===
Without providing any specific information or showing a single line of supposedly infringing code, SCO claimed that Linux infringed SCO's copyright, trade secrets, and contractual rights. The claim was fundamental to the SCOsource program, where SCO demanded that Linux users obtain licenses from SCOsource to be properly licensed to use the code in question. Exactly which parts of Linux were involved was not disclosed by SCO; this led some observers to doubt SCO actually had any proof of infringement, which was ultimately shown to be the case.

SCO originally claimed in SCO v. IBM that IBM had violated trade secrets. But these alleged violations by IBM would not have involved Linux distributors or end users. SCO's trade secret claims were dropped by SCO in their amended complaint.

SCO also claimed line-for-line literal copying of code from UNIX code files to Linux kernel files and obfuscated copying of code, but originally refused to publicly identify which code was in violation. SCO submitted to the court evidence of their claims under seal but much of it was excluded from the case after it was challenged by IBM as not meeting the specificity requirements to be included.

These examples fell into two groups. The first were segments of files or whole files alleged to originate in UNIX SVRx code such as the errno.h header file. The second group were files and materials contributed by IBM that originated with IBM development work associated with AIX and Dynix, IBM's two UNIX products.

SCO claimed each of these had a different set of issues. In order for copyright to be violated, several conditions must be met. First, the claimant must be able to show that they own the copyrights for the material in question. Second, all or a significant part of the source must be present in the infringing material. There must be enough similarity to show direct copying of material.

==== SVRx code allegedly in Linux ====
The issue of ownership of the SVRx code base was discussed above; the court ultimately found that Novell, not SCO, owned the copyrights. Besides that issue, portions of the SVRx code base that are covered by BSD copyrights or that are in the public domain.

SCO's first public disclosure of what they claimed is infringing code was at its SCO Forum conference in August 2003 at the MGM Grand Las Vegas. The first, known as the Berkeley Packet Filter, was distributed under the BSD License and is freely usable by anyone. The second example was related to memory allocation functions, also released under the BSD License. Even if this code had not been in the public domain, it was no longer in the Linux code base.

SCO also claimed that code related to application programming interfaces was copied from UNIX. Nonetheless, this code and the underlying standards they describe are in the public domain and are also covered by rights USL sold to The Open Group. A later claim was made to code segments related to ELF file format standards. This material was developed by the Tool Interface Standard (TIS) Committee and placed in the public domain. SCO claimed that the TIS Committee had no authority to place ELF in the public domain, even though SCO's predecessor in interest was a member of the committee.

SCO claimed that some other entities violated UNIX SVRx copyrights by putting UNIX code into Linux. They may or may not have brought this claim directly in any of their cases. The IBM case was about derivative works, not SVRx code (see below). The Novell case was about copyright ownership. DaimlerChrysler was about contractual compliance statements.

In a suit against AutoZone, SCO claimed violation of UNIX SVRx copyrights by putting UNIX code into Linux. When objecting to AutoZone's request for a stay pending the IBM case, SCO apparently contradicted their written complaint, claiming instead that the case was entirely about AutoZone copying certain libraries (outside the Linux kernel) from a UNIX system to a Linux-based system to facilitate moving an internal application to the Linux platform faster; SCO's original complaint failed to mention these libraries. AutoZone denied having done this with UNIX libraries.

The copyright issue was addressed directly in two of the cases. The first was by IBM in their counterclaim in SCO v. IBM. IBM moved for dismissal, stating that IBM violated no copyrights in its Linux related activities. It is also addressed by Red Hat in the Red Hat v. SCO case. Red Hat stated that SCO's statements about infringement in Linux were unproven and untrue, damaging to them and violates the Lanham Act. Red Hat asked for an injunction to stop claims of violations without proof. They also asked for a judgment that they violated no SCO copyrights.

==== Allegations of reverse copying ====
EWeek has reported allegations that SCO may have copied parts of the Linux kernel into SCO UNIX as part of its Linux Kernel Personality feature. If true, it would have meant that SCO is guilty of a breach of the Linux kernel copyrights. SCO denied the allegation, but according to Groklaw, one SCO employee confirmed the truth of it in a deposition.

==== IBM code in Linux ====
SCO claimed a number of instances of IBM Linux code as breaches of contract. These examples include code related to symmetric multiprocessing (SMP), Journaled File System (JFS), Read-copy-update (RCU) and Non-Uniform Memory Access (NUMA). The code was not shown to be in the Linux kernel. This code was developed and copyrighted by IBM. IBM added features to AIX and Dynix.

SCO claimed to have "control rights" to this due to their licensing agreements with IBM. SCO disavowed claiming that they own the code IBM wrote, rather comparing their "control rights" to an easement, rights that SCO claimed to allow them to prohibit IBM from publicizing the code they wrote, even though IBM owned the copyrights. The claim was based on language in the original license agreement that required non-disclosure of the code and claim that all code developed by UNIX licensees that is used with the code under license be held in confidence. This claim is discussed above at Control of derivative works.

=== SCO and the GPL ===
Before changing their name to the SCO Group, the company was known as Caldera International.

Caldera was one of the major distributors of Linux between 1994 and 1998. In August 1998, the company split into Caldera Systems and Caldera Thin Clients, with Caldera Systems taking over the Linux systems business and Caldera Thin Clients concentrating on the Thin Clients and embedded business. The parent and shell company Caldera, Inc. ceased to exist in 2000 after a settlement with Microsoft in the Caldera v. Microsoft lawsuit.

Caldera Systems was reorganized to become Caldera International in 2001, which was renamed to The SCO Group in 2002.

Some, like Eben Moglen, have suggested that because Caldera distributed the allegedly infringing code under the GNU General Public License (GPL), that this act would license any proprietary code in Linux.

SCO stated that they did not know their own code was in Linux, so releasing it under the GPL did not count. Nonetheless, as late as July and August 2006, long after that claim was made, SCO continued to distribute ELF files (the subject of one of SCO's claims regarding SVRx) under the GPL.

SCO also claimed, in early stages of the litigation, that the GPL is invalid and non-binding and legally unenforceable. In response, supporters of the GPL, such as Eben Moglen, claimed that SCO's right to distribute Linux relied upon the GPL being a valid copyright license. Later court filings by the SCO Group in SCO v. IBM use SCO's alleged compliance with the GPL as a defense to IBM's counterclaims.

SCO attempted to make the GPL an issue in SCO v. IBM. Under U.S. copyright law, distribution of creative works whose copyright is owned by another party is illegal without permission from the copyright owner, usually in the form of a license; the GPL is such a license, and thus allows distribution, but only under limited conditions. Since IBM released the relevant code under the terms of the GPL, it said that the only permission that SCO has to copy and distribute IBM's code in Linux is under the terms and conditions of the GPL, one of which requires the distributor to "accept" the GPL. IBM said that SCO violated the GPL by denouncing the GPL's validity, and by claiming that the GPL violates the U.S. Constitution, together with copyright, antitrust and export control laws. IBM also said that SCO's SCOsource program is incompatible with the requirement that redistributions of GPLed works must be free of copyright licensing fees (fees may be charged for the acts of duplication and support). IBM brought counterclaims alleging that SCO has violated the GPL and breached IBM's copyrights by collecting licensing fees while distributing IBM's copyrighted material.

== Status of lawsuits ==
By 2021, in practical substantive terms, SCO lost every lawsuit it filed, or that was counter-filed against it.

=== SCO v. IBM ===
On March 7, 2003, SCO filed suit against IBM. Initially this lawsuit was about breach of contract and trade secrets. Later, SCO dropped the trade secrets claim, so the claim is breach of contract. SCO also added a copyright claim related to IBM's continued use of AIX, but not related to Linux. The judge subsequently stated that the SCO Group had indeed made a claim of copyright infringement against IBM regarding Linux. IBM filed multiple counter claims, including charges of both patent violations, which were later dropped, and violation of copyright law.

On February 8, 2005, Judge Kimball ruled that IBM's motions for summary judgment were premature but added:

Viewed against the backdrop of SCO's plethora of public statements concerning IBM's and others' infringement of SCO's purported copyrights to the UNIX software, it is astonishing that SCO has not offered any competent evidence to create a disputed fact regarding whether IBM has infringed SCO's alleged copyrights through IBM's Linux activities.

On June 28, 2006, Judge Brooke Wells granted, in part, IBM's motion to limit SCO's claims and excluded 186 of SCO's 294 items of allegedly misused intellectual property (IBM had challenged 201 of them for various reasons). Wells cited a number of factors including SCO's inability to provide sufficient specificity in these claims:

In December 2003, near the beginning of this case, the court ordered SCO to, "identify and state with specificity the source code(s) that SCO is claiming forms the basis of their action against IBM." Even if SCO lacked the code behind methods and concepts at this early stage, SCO could have and should have, at least articulated which methods and concepts formed "the basis of their action against IBM." At a minimum, SCO should have identified the code behind their method and concepts in the final submission pursuant to this original order entered in December 2003 and Judge Kimball’s order entered in July 2005.

This left about 100 of SCO's items of allegedly misused intellectual property (the merits of which had not yet been judged), out of 294 items originally disclosed by SCO.

Following the partial summary judgment rulings in the SCO v. Novell Slander of Title case, Judge Kimball asked the parties in SCO v IBM to prepare by August 31, 2007, a statement of the status of this case.

In 2021, the case finally ended in a settlement.

=== Red Hat v. SCO ===
Red Hat filed suit against SCO on August 4, 2003. Red Hat sued SCO for false advertising, deceptive trade practices and asked for a declaratory judgment of noninfringement of any of SCO's copyrights. Ultimately, Red Hat substantively prevailed in this case.

=== SCO v. Novell ===
After SCO initiated their Linux campaign, they said that they were the owners of UNIX. As it was ultimately able to prove in court, Novell claimed these statements were false, and that they still owned the rights in question. After Novell registered the copyrights to some key UNIX products, SCO filed suit against Novell on January 20, 2004. Novell removed the suit to federal court on February 6, 2004.

On July 29, 2005, Novell filed its answer with the court, denying SCO's claims. Novell also filed counterclaims asking the court to force SCO to turn over the revenues it had received from UNIX licenses, less a 5% administrative fee. Additionally, Novell asked the court to place the funds in a "constructive trust" in order to ensure that SCO could pay Novell since the company's assets were depleting rapidly.

On August 10, 2007, Judge Dale Kimball, hearing the SCO v. Novell case, ruled that "the court concludes that Novell is the owner of the UNIX and UnixWare Copyrights". Novell was awarded summary judgments on a number of claims, and a number of SCO claims were denied. SCO was instructed to account for and pass to Novell an appropriate portion of income relating to SCOSource licences to Sun Microsystems and Microsoft. A number of matters were not disposed of by Judge Kimball's ruling, and the outcome of these remained pending.

On July 16, 2008, the trial court issued an order awarding Novell $2,547,817 and ruled that SCO was not authorized to enter into the 2003 agreement with Sun. On November 20, 2008, final judgment in the case affirmed the August 10 ruling, and added interest of $918,122 plus $489 per diem after August 29, 2008, along with a constructive trust of $625,486.90.

On August 24, 2009, the U.S. Court of Appeals for the Tenth Circuit partially reversed the August 10, 2007 district court summary judgment ruling. The appeals court remanded back to trial on the issues of copyright ownership and Novell's contractual waiver rights. The court upheld the $2,547,817 award granted to Novell for the 2003 Sun agreement. On March 30, 2010, after a three-week trial before Judge Ted Stewart, a jury returned a verdict "confirming Novell's ownership of the Unix copyrights."

On June 10, 2010, Judge Ted Stewart denied SCO's motion for another trial and ruled for Novell on all remaining issues.

On July 7, 2010, SCO appealed the new judgments to the United States Court of Appeals for the Tenth Circuit.

On August 30, 2011, the Tenth Circuit Court of Appeals affirmed the District Court ruling in its entirety, rejecting SCO's attempt to re-argue the case before the Court of Appeals.

=== SCO v. AutoZone ===
AutoZone, a corporate user of Linux and former user of SCO OpenServer, was sued by SCO on March 3, 2004. SCO claimed AutoZone violated SCO's copyrights by using Linux. The suit was stayed pending the resolution of the IBM, Red Hat and Novell cases.

On September 26, 2008, Judge Robert C. Jones lifted the stay, effective December 31, 2008. He initially scheduled discovery for April 9, 2010. SCO filed an amended complaint on August 14, 2009. On August 31, 2009, AutoZone replied, and filed a motion to dismiss in part.

On October 22, 2009, Edward Cahn, SCO's Chapter 11 trustee, sought bankruptcy court approval for an agreement he reached with AutoZone. According to the court filings, the confidential settlement resolves all claims between SCO and AutoZone.

=== SCO v. DaimlerChrysler ===
In December 2003, SCO demanded that some UNIX licensees certify certain issues regarding their use of Linux. DaimlerChrysler, a former UNIX user and current Linux user, did not respond to this demand. On March 3, 2004, SCO filed suit against DaimlerChrysler for violating their UNIX license agreement by failing to respond to the certification request. Almost every claim SCO made has been ruled against in summary judgment. The last remaining issue, that of whether DaimlerChrysler made a timely response, was dismissed by agreement of SCO and DaimlerChrysler in December 2004. SCO retained the right to continue this case at a future date, providing it pays legal fees to DaimlerChrysler.

== Other issues and conflicts ==
=== SCO announces that it will not sue its own customers ===
On June 23, 2003, SCO sent out a letter announcing that it would not be suing its own Linux customers. In the letter, it stated:

SCO will continue to support our SCO Linux and OpenLinux customers and partners who have previously implemented those products and we will hold them harmless from any SCO intellectual property issues regarding Linux.

=== SCO and SGI ===
In August 2003, SCO presented two examples of what they claimed was illegal copying of copyrighted code from UNIX to Linux. One of the examples (Berkeley Packet Filter) was not related to original UNIX code at all. The other example did, however, seem to originate from the UNIX code and was apparently contributed by a UNIX vendor, Silicon Graphics. An analysis by the Linux community later revealed that:

- The code originated from an even older version of UNIX that at some point was published by Caldera, thus making any claim of copyright infringement shaky.
- The code did not do anything. It was in a part of the Linux kernel that was written in anticipation of a Silicon Graphics architecture that was never released.
- It had already been removed from the kernel two months earlier.
- The contested segment was small (80 lines) and trivial.

=== SCO and BayStar Capital ===
In October 2003, BayStar Capital and Royal Bank of Canada invested US$50 million in The SCO Group to support the legal cost of SCO's Linux campaign. Later, it was shown that BayStar was referred to SCO by Microsoft, whose proprietary Windows operating system competes with Linux. In 2003, BayStar looked at SCO on the recommendation of Microsoft, according to Lawrence R. Goldfarb, managing partner of BayStar Capital: "It was evident that Microsoft had an agenda".

On April 22, 2004, The New York Times reported that BayStar Capital, a private hedge fund that had co-arranged for $50M in funding for SCO in October 2003, was asking for its $20M back. The remainder of the $50M was from Royal Bank of Canada. SCO stated in their press release that they believed that BayStar did not have grounds for making this demand.

On August 27, 2004, SCO and BayStar resolved their dispute.

=== SCO and Canopy Group ===
The Canopy Group is an investment group with shares in a trust of different companies. It is a group owned by the Noorda family, also founders of Novell.

Until February 2005, Canopy held SCO shares, and the management of SCO held shares of Canopy. The two parties became embroiled in a bitter dispute when the Noorda family sought to oust board member Ralph Yarro III on claims of misappropriation. With internal problems not made public (which included the suicides of Canopy's director of information systems, Robert Penrose, and Val Kriedel, the daughter of Ray Noorda), the Canopy Group agreed to buy back all the shares that SCO had in Canopy in exchange for their SCO shares and cash.

SCO and Canopy Group became mostly independent, although SCO did continue to rent their Utah office space from Canopy.

=== Microsoft funding of SCO controversy ===
On March 4, 2004, a leaked SCO internal e-mail detailed how Microsoft had raised up to $106 million via the BayStar referral and other means. Blake Stowell of SCO confirmed the memo was real, but claimed it to be "a misunderstanding". BayStar claimed the deal was suggested by Microsoft, but that no money for it came directly from them. In addition to the Baystar involvement, Microsoft paid SCO $6M (USD) in May 2003 for a license to "Unix and Unix-related patents", despite the lack of Unix-related patents owned by SCO. License deals between both companies may have reached at least $16M (USD) according to U.S. Securities and Exchange Commission (SEC) filings. This deal was widely seen in the press as a boost to SCO's finances that would help SCO with its lawsuit against IBM.

=== SCOsource ===
After their initial claim of copyright infringement in the Linux kernel, The SCO Group started their SCOsource initiative, which sold licenses to SCO's claimed copyrighted software, other than OpenServer and Unixware licenses. After a small number of high-profile sales (including one that was denied by the claimed purchaser), SCO claimed to offer corporate users of Linux a license at US$699 per processor running Linux. SCO said that participants of the SCOsource initiative were not liable for any claims that SCO made against Linux users.

=== The Michael Davidson E-Mail ===
On July 14, 2005, an email was unsealed that had been sent from Michael Davidson to Reg Broughton (both Caldera International employees) in 2002, before a number of the lawsuits. In it, Davidson reported how the company had hired an outside consultant because (spelling as in the original):

...of SCO's executive management refusing to believe that it was possible for Linux and much of the GNU software to have come into existence without *someone* *somewhere* having copied pieces of proprietary UNIX source code to which SCO owned the copyright. The hope was that we would find a "smoking gun" somewhere in code that was being used by Red Hat and/or the other Linux companies that would give us some leverage. (There was, at one stage, the idea that we would sell licences to corporate customers who were using Linux as a kind of "insurance policy" in case it turned out that they were using code which infringed on our copyright).

The consultant was to review the Linux code and compare it to Unix source code, to find possible copyright infringement. Davidson himself said that he had not expected to find anything significant based on his own knowledge of the code and had voiced his opinion that it was "a waste of time". After 4 to 6 months of consultant's work, Davidson says:

...we had found absolutely *nothing*. ie no evidence of any copyright infringement whatsoever.

== See also ==
- Timeline of SCO–Linux disputes
- Copyfraud
- Association of Licensed Automobile Manufacturers (ALAM) – similar attempt to sue buyers of automobiles
