= UNIX System Laboratories, Inc. v. Berkeley Software Design, Inc. =

1992 lawsuit in the United States

UNIX System Laboratories, Inc. v. Berkeley Software Design, Inc. was a lawsuit brought in New Jersey federal court in 1992 by Unix System Laboratories (USL) against Berkeley Software Design, Inc. (BSDi) and the Regents of the University of California over intellectual property related to the Unix operating system; a culmination of the Unix wars. The case was settled out of court in 1994 after the judge expressed doubt in the validity of USL's intellectual property, with Novell (who by that time had bought USL) and the university agreeing not to litigate further over the Berkeley Software Distribution (BSD).

== Background ==
The suit has its roots at the Computer Systems Research Group (CSRG) at the University of California, Berkeley, which had a license for the source code of Unix from AT&T's Bell Labs. Students doing operating systems research at the CSRG modified and extended Unix, and the CSRG made several releases of the modified operating system beginning in 1978, with AT&T's blessing. Because this Berkeley Software Distribution (BSD) contained copyrighted AT&T Unix source code, it was only available to organizations with a source code license for Unix from AT&T.

Students and faculty at the CSRG audited the software code for the TCP/IP stack, removing all the AT&T intellectual property, and released it to the general public in 1988 as "Net/1", under the BSD license. As it became clear that the Berkeley CSRG would soon shut down, students and faculty there launched an effort to eliminate all remaining AT&T code from BSD and replace it with code of their own. This effort resulted in the public release of Net/2 in 1991, again under the BSD license. Net/2 contained enough code for a nearly complete Unix-like system, which the CSRG believed contained no AT&T intellectual property.

Berkeley Software Design (BSDi) obtained the source for Net/2, filled in the missing pieces, and ported it to the Intel i386 computer architecture. BSDi then sold the resulting BSD/386 operating system. This drew the ire of AT&T, which did not agree with BSDi's claim that BSD/386 was free of AT&T's intellectual property. AT&T's Unix System Laboratories subsidiary filed suit against BSDi in New Jersey in April 1992, a suit that was later amended to include The Regents of the University of California.

== USL's complaint ==
In the lawsuit, USL alleged that:

- The Regents of the University of California, by releasing Net/2 "based upon, substantially copied from, or derived from proprietary UNIX", had
  - breached USL's software license contract;
  - infringed on USL's copyright on UNIX;
  - diluted USL's trademark on UNIX;
  - misappropriated USL's trade secret on UNIX.

On these grounds, USL asked the court for a preliminary injunction that would bar BSDi from distributing the Net/2 software until the case was decided.

== Pretrial ==
At a hearing, BSDi contended that they were using the sources freely distributed by the University of California, plus six additional files. BSDi accepted liability for their own six files, but refused to account for the other files distributed by the University of California. The judge agreed with BSDI's argument and told USL to restate their complaint based solely on the six files, or he would dismiss it. Rather than narrow down their claim, USL chose to sue BSDi and the University of California, and requested a preliminary injunction on the distribution of Net/2 from both.

In 1993, Judge Dickinson R. Debevoise denied a preliminary injunction on the grounds that USL had no valid copyright over UNIX/32V and could not show any obvious trade secret. Works published in the U.S. between January 1, 1978, and March 1, 1989, were subject to the provisions of 17 U.S.C. § 405(a), which required the copyright owner to properly affix a copyright notice to the work to claim copyright protection. AT&T released 32V in 1978, but omitted a notice from thousands of copies and failed to copyright 32V until 1992.

== University's countersuit ==
In 1993, a few days after the dismissal of the preliminary injunction, the university filed a countersuit against USL in California, claiming that USL had failed to credit the university for the use of BSD code in System V, as required by the software license contract. The university demanded that USL be forced to reprint all their documentation with the appropriate due credit added, to notify all their licensees of their oversight, and to run full-page advertisements in major publications such as The Wall Street Journal and Fortune Magazine informing the public of their omission.

== Settlement ==
In July 1993, soon after UC filed its countersuit, USL was purchased by Novell. Novell CEO Ray Noorda favored a settlement that was reached in February 1994. The salient points were:

- 4.4BSD-Lite to be released containing no disputed files. University to encourage licensees to switch from Net/2.
- University to cease distribution of certain files.
- USL to grant three months' grace period to users of disputed files.
- Certain files distributed by the university to carry the USL copyright notice.
- Certain files distributed by USL to carry University copyright notices.
- USL to permit free distribution of certain files.
- The university is not to actively assist in legal attempts to challenge USL's rights to certain files.

Of the 18,000 files in the Berkeley distribution, only three had to be removed and 70 modified to show USL copyright notices. A further condition of the settlement was that USL would not file further lawsuits against users and distributors of the upcoming 4.4BSD-Lite release.

== See also ==
- SCO–Linux disputes
- SCO–SGI code dispute of 2003
- SCO v. IBM
- Red Hat v. SCO
- SCO v. DaimlerChrysler
- SCO v. AutoZone
- SCO v. Novell
- Unix wars
- Clean-room design
