= Transports Schiocchet Excursions =

Transports Schiocchet Excursions is a French bus company that runs a bus route from Moselle to Luxembourg.

As of 2005, it is involved in litigation against ten cleaning women who share car journeys to work on the same route, accusing them of "unfair and parasitical competition", demanding financial damages and the confiscation of the cleaning women's cars. The lawsuit has been widely derided, and has been described on Groklaw as "the stupidest lawsuit since the world began".

Although the company has already lost once in the Briey commercial tribunal, it is now pursuing the women in a higher court, the Court of Bankruptcy.
