= Mark Webbink =

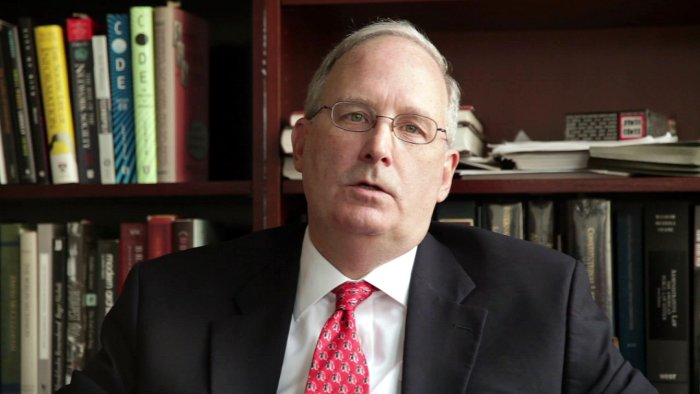
Webbink in 2010

Mark Webbink is an American lawyer and visiting professor of law at New York Law School (NYLS). At NYLS, Webbink serves as the executive director of the Center for Patent Innovations, the home of the Peer-to-Patent program.

Webbink is also a senior lecturing fellow at Duke University School of Law and a member of the board of Software Freedom Law Center, which he joined in October 2007. Webbink worked at Red Hat as its first general counsel from 2000 to 2004 and its deputy general counsel for intellectual property from 2004 to August 2007, when he retired.

Webbink wrote a blog, now defunct, covering open source and intellectual property issues.

On May 16, 2011, Groklaw's Pamela Jones announced that Webbink would be Groklaw's new editor.
