= SCO–SGI code dispute of 2003 =

During its SCO Forum conference of 2003, the SCO Group (SCO) showed several examples of allegedly illegal copying of copyrighted code into Linux. The open source software community quickly debunked most of them. One example showed some Unix code within some of SGI's Linux contributions. The Linux maintainers stated that this code had already been removed from Linux before the example had been revealed — not because it was infringing, but because it had needlessly duplicated some functions already present in Linux. SGI and other analysts also confirmed that the code had never infringed.

== Background ==
During SCO Forum, on August 17–19, 2003 at the MGM Grand Las Vegas, SCO publicly showed several alleged examples of illegal copying of copyrighted code in Linux. Until then, these examples had only been available under NDA, which had prohibited them from communicating about it. SCO claimed the infringements are divided into four separate categories: literal copying, obfuscation, derivative works, and non-literal transfers.

The example used by SCO to demonstrate literal copying is also known as the atemalloc example. The name of the original contributor was not revealed by SCO, but quick analysis pointed to SGI. It was also revealed that the code had already been removed from the Linux kernel, because it duplicated existing functions.

Within days, the open source community started several different analyses of the infringing code. The results of these analyses differ slightly, but they all confirm that it was derived from Unix code. These analyses also pointed out that while the code could possibly have originated in Unix, this does not necessarily prove infringement of copyrights.

The community was determined that this was a particularly bad example, because the code in question had never been used in the mainstream distributions of Linux, and had been present only in the IA-64 version. The relative sparseness of worldwide IA-64 installations, combined with the limited time in which the code was present in Linux, makes the chance of actually encountering a system running this code very slim.

== Origin ==
It is possible that the code contributed to Linux originated from UNIX System V, but its original implementation happened in the early 1970s. There are substantial portions of UNIX System V that originate with Research Unix from the 1970s. Dennis Ritchie, one of the creators of Unix, acknowledged that either he or Ken Thompson wrote the original code from which the UNIX System V code is derived:

So: either Ken or I wrote it originally. I know that the comments that first appeared by the 6th edition were definitely written by me, since I spent some time annotating the almost comment-free earlier editions.

This is very important, because early Unix source code was licensed differently compared to UNIX System V. At that time, the law required explicit copyright claims, which effectively means the early Unix code is not protected by copyright law. Additionally, both Santa Cruz Operation and The SCO Group released the source code of early versions of Unix under a 4-clause BSD-like license, allowing its use in other open source products.

== SGI response ==
On October 1, 2003, SGI responded to SCO's allegations in an open letter to the Linux community. In it, Rich Altmaier, vice president of software, claims that these small code fragments were inadvertently included in the Linux kernel:

All together, these three small code fragments comprised no more than 200 lines out of the more than one million lines of our overall contributions to Linux. Notably, it appears that most or all of the System V code fragments we found had previously been placed in the public domain, meaning it is very doubtful that the SCO Group has any proprietary claim to these code fragments in any case.

== See also ==
- SCO–Linux disputes
- USL v. BSDi
