= Blake Stowell =

Blake Stowell was the director of corporate communications for The SCO Group, and as such, played a significant role in the Timeline of SCO–Linux disputes. He is currently PR Director for Omniture Inc. Prior to SCO, Stowell had worked for WordPerfect (1993–1995), Brodeur Worldwide (1996-1998), Novell (1998–2000), embedded Linux developer Lineo (2000–2001), and Microsoft (2001).

Blake grew up in Bellevue, Washington where he bred and raised racing pigeons for most of his childhood and early adolescence. Blake was one of the founding members of the keyboard duo LVDT Simulator.
