= SCO Group, Inc. v. Novell, Inc. =

2010 United States court case

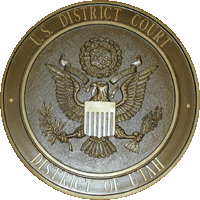
- Court: United States District Court for the District of Utah
- Full case name: The SCO Group, Inc. v. Novell, Inc.
- Decided: June 10, 2010
- Docket nos.: 2:04-cv-00139
- Citation: 721 F. Supp. 2d 1050

Case history
- Prior actions: 578 F.3d 1201 (10th Cir. 2009); cert. denied, 561 U.S. 1051 (2010).
- Subsequent action: 439 F. App'x 688 (10th Cir. 2011).
- Related action: United States Bankruptcy Court for the District of Delaware

Holding
- SCO's claims of ownership of Unix intellectual property dismissed; Novell's claims of ownership confirmed; SCO owed Novell $2.5 million in unpaid royalties

Court membership
- Judges sitting: Dale A. Kimball; Ted Stewart

Keywords
- copyright, slander of title, breach of contract, breach of fiduciary duties, conversion, unjust enrichment

SCO v. Novell was a United States lawsuit in which the software company The SCO Group (SCO), claimed ownership of the source code for the Unix operating system. SCO sought to have the court declare that SCO owned the rights to the Unix code, including the copyrights, and that Novell had committed slander of title by asserting a rival claim to ownership of the Unix copyrights. Separately, SCO was attempting to collect license fees from Linux end-users for Unix code (that they alleged was copied into Linux) through their SCOsource division, and Novell's rival ownership claim was a direct challenge to this initiative. Novell had been increasing their investments in and support of Linux at this time, and was opposed to SCO's attempts to collect license fees from Novell's potential customers.

The case hinged upon the interpretation of asset-transfer agreements governing Novell's sale of their Unix business to one of SCO's predecessor companies, the Santa Cruz Operation. The original APA explicitly excluded all copyrights from the assets transferred from Novell to the Santa Cruz Operation. The second amendment to the APA amended the agreement to exclude all copyrights, "except for the copyrights required for the Santa Cruz Operation to exercise its rights" under the APA. The list of included assets was never amended, which caused ambiguity years after the deal was signed. At trial, Novell successfully argued that they had retained copyrights to protect their 95% ownership of Unix SVRX royalties, and that the amendment to the exclusion clause was merely affirming that the Santa Cruz Operation had a license to the Unix code.

Novell counter-sued with their own duelling slander of title claim and several additional claims against SCO related to the APA and asked the Court to find that SCO had breached the agreements by signing Unix license agreements with Sun Microsystems and Microsoft without paying Novell the agreed percentage of those agreements. Novell further asked the court to find that Novell retained the right to direct SCO to waive rights under existing Unix licenses at "Novell's sole discretion", and that they had the right to take the action on SCO's behalf if SCO refused (a purported right that Novell had used repeatedly in the months leading up to the lawsuit to waive SCO's claims against IBM and others). Additional claims and counterclaims were added by the parties before resolution of the case.

Novell was found to be the owner of the Unix copyrights, to have the right to direct SCO to waive its claims against IBM and other Unix licensees (and to do so on behalf of SCO if they refused), and SCO was found to have breached the asset-transfer agreements and to have committed conversion of Novell's property. SCO prevailed on none of their claims against Novell.

== Background ==
Novell, a vendor of proprietary network operating systems, acquired the rights to the original Unix source code when it purchased Unix System Laboratories from Unix's creator, AT&T Corporation, on June 14, 1993. Novell's rights to parts of the Unix source code were established as part of the settlement in USL v. BSDi.

On September 19, 1995, Novell entered into an Asset Purchase Agreement (APA) with the Santa Cruz Operation, a Unix vendor. The APA transferred certain rights regarding Unix, and Novell's UnixWare version of Unix, from Novell to the Santa Cruz Operation. These rights included the right to develop and market new versions of UnixWare, and the right to license SVRX (System V Release X) UNIX incidentally or with Novell's permission. It also required the Santa Cruz Operation to act as Novell's agent for the collection for certain royalties due under such licenses.

In 2000, Caldera Systems acquired the Server Software and Services divisions of the Santa Cruz Operation, as well as the UnixWare and OpenServer Unix technologies. Caldera Systems thus became the legal successor to the Santa Cruz Operation for the purposes of the APA. A year later Caldera Systems changed its name to Caldera International in 2001 and to The SCO Group (SCO) in 2002. Although the Santa Cruz Operation was colloquially known as "SCO", legally The SCO Group is a different company from the Santa Cruz Operation.

=== SCO goes on the offensive ===
In 2003, SCO initiated a campaign to compel Linux users to pay them software license fees, claiming that unspecified SCO intellectual property had been improperly included in Linux. As part of this campaign, SCO made several statements that they were the owners of Unix, implying that they held the copyright for the original AT&T source code of Unix, and derivatives of that code. After SCO filed suit against IBM, claiming that IBM had violated SCO's copyrights to Unix, Novell publicly responded to these allegations.

=== Novell asserts it owns the copyrights ===
On May 28, 2003, Novell issued a press release titled "Novell Challenges SCO Position, Reiterates Support for Linux" where they publicly challenged SCO's assertions that Unix code had been copied into Linux, or that SCO owned the Unix copyrights.

On June 6, 2003, SCO held a press conference in which it revealed a second amendment to the "asset purchase agreement between Novell and Santa Cruz Operation". SCO claimed this amendment supported its claim to the Unix copyrights. This amendment did not change the included assets list (which still did not list copyrights), but instead amended the excluded assets list to continue to exclude copyrights, except those "required" by SCO. In response, Novell issued a press release in which it stated:

To Novell's knowledge, this amendment is not present in Novell's files. The amendment appears to support SCO's claim that ownership of certain copyrights for Unix did transfer to SCO in 1996. The amendment does not address ownership of patents, however, which clearly remain with Novell.

While SCO publicly claimed victory, behind the scenes SCO and Novell traded a series of heated letters. In a flurry of private letters, Novell continued its claim that they still were the legal owner of the Unix copyrights, and exercised a series of rights under the APA over the following months (including issuing waivers of SCO's claims against certain parties, auditing SCO's collection of Unix SVRX royalties, demanding access to all versions of Unix code under SCO's control per the APA's related Technology License Agreement and issuing a cease and desist against SCO for seeking information from former Novell executives). The relationship between the companies quickly deteriorated.

On October 14, 2003, Novell registered several key Unix copyrights with the United States Copyright Office and submitted declarations for recordation against SCO's own Unix copyright registrations. These declarations stated: "The SCO Group, Inc. ... has failed ... to demonstrate that any of the Unix copyrights owned by Novell are required for SCO to exercise its rights..." and that "Novell hereby declares that it retains all or substantially all of the ownership of the copyrights in Unix, including [SCO's] U.S. Copyright Registration referenced above".

After the registrations became public knowledge, Novell issued a press release on December 22, 2003, stating:

Novell believes it owns the copyrights in Unix, and has applied for and received copyright registrations pertaining to Unix consistent with that position. Novell detailed the basis for its ownership position in correspondence with SCO. Copies of our correspondence, and SCO's reply, are available [on our website]. Contrary to SCO's public statements, as demonstrated by this correspondence, SCO has been well aware that Novell continues to assert ownership of the Unix copyrights.

On January 13, 2004, Novell announced that it was indemnifying Linux users, agreeing to protect them from lawsuits by third parties, like SCO, on the basis of violating the copyrights claimed by Novell. The same day, Novell released over 30 letters that SCO and Novell had exchanged in the previous months. SCO immediately responded with a press release reiterating its earlier claim, and announcing that it was preparing to file a lawsuit against Novell.

== The lawsuit ==
=== Utah state court ===
SCO filed a slander of title lawsuit against Novell on January 20, 2004. Filed in Utah state court, the lawsuit requested both preliminary and permanent injunctions assigning all of Novell's Unix copyright registrations to SCO and forcing Novell to retract all of their claims to the Unix code.

=== United States District Court for the District of Utah ===
Novell removed the lawsuit to the Federal court system on February 6, 2004. This removal was upheld in the court's June 9 ruling.

On February 10, 2004, Novell filed a motion to dismiss the case. Novell requested dismissal for failure to state a claim upon which relief could be granted. Novell argued that:

- SCO did not show a valid transfer of copyright ownership, because the Asset Purchase Agreement was merely a promise to assign under specific circumstances (SCO's demonstration that copyrights were "required" to exercise other rights under the contract), and that the Agreement is therefore—by law—not sufficient to transfer the copyrights to SCO; and
- SCO did not specify specific special damages required for such a claim.

In response, SCO filed several memoranda opposing Novell's motion to dismiss the case. Additionally, SCO filed a motion to remand the case back to State court. Novell countered that, because the case would hinge upon interpretation of federal copyright law, it should be tried in federal court.

On May 9, 2004, federal Judge Dale A. Kimball heard both parties' arguments and took both motions under advisement. Judge Kimball denied SCO's motion to remand and partially granted Novell's motion to dismiss on June 9, 2004, on a pleading technicality. The case was dismissed without prejudice, which allowed SCO to amend their complaint to include properly pleaded special damages.

==== Novell's countersuit ====
On July 29, 2005, Novell filed a countersuit against SCO claiming slander of title, breach of contract, failure to remit royalties, and failure to conduct audit obligations. Novell sought damages in excess of SCO's net worth, and, as SCO was quickly burning through its assets and cash on hand, Novell asked the court to sequester this money from SCO so that it would not be spent before the resolution of the case. Novell also asked the court to attach SCO's assets pending adjudication of their claims. Novell accused SCO of licensing Unix System V Release 4 to Microsoft and Sun Microsystems without then sending Novell the 95% of the license fees as required by the APA.

In the counter-claim, Novell stated that SCO had asked Novell to participate in the SCO's Linux IP infringement licensing plan. When Novell refused, SCO asked Novell to turn the Unix copyrights over to SCO, a request Novell also refused.

==== SuSE arbitration ====
SCO filed a second amended complaint on February 6, 2006, containing the original slander of title claim as well as several new claims, including unfair competition, copyright infringement (for Novell's distribution of SUSE Linux), and breaching a purported non-compete agreement (again, related to SUSE Linux).

On April 10, 2006, Novell's SuSE division (a European vendor of Linux operating systems) filed a request for arbitration against SCO with the Secretariat of the International Chamber of Commerce's International Court of Arbitration in Paris, France. Years earlier, while still known as Caldera International, SCO had signed contracts with then-independent SuSE, among others, involving the United Linux product. The United Linux members agreed that each member would have broad licenses to exploit and distribute Linux products that included United Linux technology. These agreements included clauses requiring the members to use an arbitration process to resolve disputes.

SuSE's arbitration request was a response to SCO's amended complaint against Novell. The arbitration process has relatively strict timelines, unlike the U.S. courts' procedures. Novell filed a Motion to Stay Claims Raising Issues Subject to Arbitration in the U.S. courts, saying that four of SCO's five claims had been brought to arbitration, including the claim of copyright infringement, and thus should be stayed until the arbitration tribunal rendered its decision. Novell also filed an Answer to SCO's 2nd Amended Complaint and Counterclaims, claiming a large number of affirmative defenses, including a claim that SCO committed fraud upon the U.S. copyright office.

==== Licensing agreements and Novell's motion for summary judgement ====
On September 22, 2006, Novell sought leave to file amended counterclaims. Through discovery, Novell had obtained copies of SCO's Unix licensing agreements with Microsoft and Sun. Upon reviewing the agreements, Novell claimed that they breached the APA. The added claims were conversion and breach of fiduciary duties. SCO stipulated to Novell's motion, and therefore Judge Kimball granted it.

Novell filed a motion on September 29, 2006, asking for summary judgment, or if that was rejected, then for a preliminary injunction. Novell alleged that SCO, through their agreements with Sun and Microsoft, licensed Novell's property without paying Novell the royalties it was due under the APA. Novell asked the court to force SCO to turn the royalties over to Novell or, in the alternative, be forced to put the money into a collective trust, where neither party would be able to access it until the issue was decided by the courts.

On August 10, 2007, Judge Kimball ruled that "...Novell is the owner of the Unix and UnixWare Copyrights." Novell was awarded summary judgment on a number of its claims, and a number of SCO's claims were denied. SCO was instructed to account for, and pass to Novell, an appropriate portion of its income from the Sun and Microsoft licenses.

Judge Kimball's ruling stated that "SCO is obligated to recognize Novell's waiver of SCO's claims against IBM and Sequent," referring to other cases SCO had filed against those companies for allegedly violating SCO's intellectual property rights in Unix. After the ruling, Novell announced they had no interest in suing people over Unix, stating "We don't believe there is Unix in Linux."

=== SCO's bankruptcy ===
The parties were expected to go to trial on September 17, 2007, in order to determine exactly how much money SCO owed Novell. However, on September 14, the SCO Group filed for bankruptcy under Chapter 11 of the United States Bankruptcy Code. As SCO was a Delaware corporation, the bankruptcy filing was made with the United States Bankruptcy Court for the District of Delaware. The filing caused all pending litigation to be automatically stayed as required by the United States Code.

On November 27, 2007, United States Bankruptcy Judge Kevin Gross lifted the automatic stay so as to allow the Utah court to determine how much money SCO owed Novell, but the bankruptcy court retained jurisdiction over any constructive trust that the Federal court might create.

=== Trial to determine damages ===
For the purposes of the trial to determine how much money SCO owed Novell, SCO was named the defendant and Novell was named the plaintiff, because SCO had not prevailed on any of its initial claims. The trial commenced April 30, 2008. Novell sought the recovery of $19,979,561 from SCO based on its licenses to Microsoft, Sun, and others.

On July 16, 2008, the Utah court awarded

...Defendant and Counterclaimant Novell $2,547,817 on its Sixth, Seventh, and Eighth Claims for Unjust Enrichment, Breach of Fiduciary Duty, and Conversion. On Novell's Fourth Claim for Relief, for the reasons stated above, the court concludes that SCO was entitled to enter into the 2003 Microsoft Agreement and the other SCOsource licenses, but was not authorized to enter into the 2003 Sun Agreement based on its amendment of the provisions concerning Sun's SVRX confidentiality requirements under the 1994 Agreement.

The decision, which SCO could appeal, granted Novell the asked-for $2,547,817 award due to the 2003 Sun Agreement's modification of the 1994 confidentiality provisions. These modifications permitted the release of OpenSolaris.

On November 20, 2008, Kimball's final judgment in the case affirmed his August 10, 2007 ruling, granting Novell the award plus interest of $918,122, plus $489 additional interest for every day after August 29, 2008, should SCO fail to pay the award by that date. The ruling also ordered a constructive trust of $625,486.90. Judge Kimball dismissed the case with no possibility to re-file the suit with an amended complaint, restricting SCO to pursue the case only in appeals.

=== Circuit Court appeal ===
On August 24, 2009, the U.S. Court of Appeals for the Tenth Circuit partially reversed Kimball's August 10, 2007, summary judgement, insofar as Kimball had found that Novell owned the copyright to Unix. The portion dealing with the 2003 Sun agreement was upheld by the appeals court. As a result, SCO could pursue its ownership of the Unix copyrights at trial. However, it remained liable for the $2,547,817 royalty award.

Novell filed a petition for a writ of certiorari on March 4, 2010, seeking intervention by the Supreme Court of the United States. Novell argued that there is a circuit split on the correct interpretation of the Copyright Act's transfer requirements, and that the correct requirements are more strict than the Tenth Circuit's holding in this case. The petition was dismissed by the Supreme Court.

=== Trial on remand for copyright issues ===
The jury trial on the remanded copyright issues began on March 8, 2010, before Judge Ted Stewart. It was expected to last three weeks. On March 30, the jury returned a unanimous verdict in favor of Novell. On June 10, Judge Stewart ruled in favor of Novell on all issues, closing the case. The court found that Novell had not committed slander of title, was not now required to transfer the copyrights under the APA, that its copyright waivers issued to IBM were authorized, and that they did not violate the covenant of good faith.

SCO appealed the district court judgment to the United States Court of Appeals for the Tenth Circuit on July 7, 2010.

On August 30, 2011, the Appeals Court affirmed the trial decision.

== See also ==
- SCO/Linux controversies
- Groklaw
- Caldera OpenLinux
