= Slander of title =

In law, slander of title is normally a claim involving real estate in which one entity publishes a false statement that disparages or clouds another entity's title to property, causing a financial loss. Alternatively, it is casting aspersion on someone else's property, business or goods, e.g., claiming a house is infested with termites (when it is not), or falsely claiming ownership of another's copyright (what allegedly occurred in the SCO v. Novell case). Slander of title is a form of jactitation.

Slander of title is one of the "specialized" common law intentional torts. The State of California has adopted the definition of slander of title set forth in section 624 of the Restatement of Torts as follows:

One who, without a privilege to do so, publishes matter which is untrue and disparaging to another's property in land, chattels or intangible things under such circumstances as would lead a reasonable man to foresee that the conduct of a third person as purchaser or lessee thereof might be determined thereby is liable for pecuniary loss resulting to the other from the impairment of vendibility thus caused.

The term "slander of title" is somewhat of a misnomer, as slander refers to that which is spoken yet the tort slander of title requires publication. A more accurate term would be "disparagement of title".

A slander of title suit can be pursued with merit in a variety of circumstances including "the filing of an invalid lien against real property or virtually any type of recordable instrument recorded against a property by one without privilege which is untrue." It is not a requirement that it be recorded, merely published, and in the broadest sense of the word. "Published" can even refer to the placement of a lawn sign with an untrue disparaging statement in front of someone's property.
