= Fear, uncertainty, and doubt =

Tactic used to influence opinion

Fear, Uncertainty, and Doubt (FUD), or Fear, Uncertainty, Doubt, and Despair (FUDD), is a manipulative tactic used in sales, media, marketing, public relations, opinion polling, and cults. FUD is generally a strategy to influence by disseminating negative, dubious, and false information. It is a tactic based on fear appeal, and shares commonalities with 'fearmongering'.

== Origin ==
The phrase "fear, uncertainty, and doubt" was used in the 1920s. A similar phrase "fear, uncertainty, and disinformation" is also used.

By 1975, "FUD" was appearing in contexts of marketing, sales, and in public relations:

One of the messages dealt with is FUD—the fear, uncertainty and doubt on the part of customer and sales person alike that stifles the approach.

FUD was first used in the sense of its current commonly-associated technology-related meaning by Gene Amdahl in 1975, after he left IBM to found Amdahl Corporation

FUD is the fear, uncertainty and doubt that IBM sales people instill in the minds of potential customers who might be considering Amdahl products.

== Examples ==
=== Software producers ===
==== Microsoft ====
In the 1990s, the term FUD became most often associated with Microsoft. It has been said that Microsoft borrowed the concept from IBM and used it as a primary marketing tool in the 1980s.

In 1996, Caldera, Inc. accused Microsoft of several anti-competitive practices, including issuing vaporware announcements, creating FUD, and excluding competitors from participating in beta-test programs, in order to tamp-down or drive-out competition in the DOS market. In 2000, Microsoft settled the lawsuit out-of-court for an undisclosed sum; in 2009, that sum was revealed to be $280 million (roughly $542.9 million in 2026).

==== SCO v. IBM ====
The SCO Group's 2003 lawsuit against International Business Machines, SCO v. IBM, was related to the Microsoft Halloween documents leak; it claimed a $5 billion loss due to intellectual property infringements by the free software community. IBM suggested the case was an example of FUD, which argued in its counterclaim that SCO was spreading "fear, uncertainty, and doubt".

==== Apple ====
When Apple Inc. claimed that the operating system jailbreaking of its iPhone operating system, iOS, could potentially allow hackers to crash cell phone towers, Fred von Lohmann, a representative of the Electronic Frontier Foundation (EFF), described Apple's claim as a "kind of theoretical threat...more FUD than truth".

=== Technical support scams ===
FUD has also been described as a common part of technical support scams.

=== Caltex ===
The FUD tactic was used by Caltex Australia in 2003. According to an internal memo, which was subsequently leaked, Caltex Australia wished to use FUD to destabilize franchisee confidence, and thus get a better deal for Caltex. This memo was used as an example of unconscionable behaviour in a Australian Senate inquiry. Senior management claimed that it was contrary to, and did not reflect, company principles.
