= Pamela Jones =

Computer law scholar

Pamela Jones, commonly known as PJ, is the creator and was editor of Groklaw, a website that covered legal news of interest to the free and open-source software community. Jones is an open source advocate who previously trained and worked as a paralegal.

Jones' articles have appeared in Linux Journal, LWN, LinuxWorld Magazine, Linux Today, and LinuxWorld.com. She also wrote a monthly opinion column for the UK print publication Linux User and Developer. She is one of the contributors to the book Open Sources 2.0: The Continuing Evolution.

In 2010, the Electronic Frontier Foundation awarded the Pioneer award to "Pamela Jones and the Groklaw Website" for "Legal Blogging".

== Grok projects ==
=== Groklaw ===
Jones had a website, Groklaw, which covered open source legal issues, notably the SCO–Linux disputes. The website started as a blog but grew from there.

Groklaw covered the various lawsuits involving the SCO Group in detail but also covered general legal news of interest to the Free Software and Open Source community. The site won numerous awards, including the Electronic Frontier Foundation Pioneer Award in 2010 and the American Bar Association Journal Blawg 100 in 2012.

Groklaw shut down on August 20, 2013, following the Lavabit email shutdown, because there was "no way to do Groklaw without email", and the inability to privately collaborate without it: "I can't do Groklaw without your input."

=== Grokline ===
Jones also launched Grokline, a Unix ownership timeline project, in February 2004.

=== Grokdoc ===
Grokdoc was a Groklaw spinoff whose original goal was to create a useful manual on basic Linux tasks that new Linux users will find simple and clear and easy to follow, using what they learn from their study. The site now also supports many other collaborative projects which benefit from its wiki-like structure.

== Use of initials ==
Jones reveals very little personal information, as she considers it private and has expressed from the beginning a strong preference for avoiding fame. Here are the reasons she gave in the early days for using just her initials:

I originally wanted to stay anonymous, in a sense, by just saying PJ. Eventually media attention and other factors made it impossible to remain just PJ but I would have if I could have. I have no desire to be famous, for one thing. And I have been creatively influenced by Scott McCloud's work. He points out in Understanding Comics (p. 45–51) in a section on iconic representation that people respond most strongly to a drawing of a character that simplifies to the point that anyone can identify with the character. I guess I was hoping for that effect. In other words, I was hoping people could assume whatever they wanted and just focus on what I said, rather than on who was saying it. For that reason, I chose PJ, because it could be anyone, either sex, any nationality, anyone and no one in particular. I wanted participation by anyone interested in the SCO story. No politics. Nothing extraneous. Just an effort to locate and provide evidence that could be useful. I knew the community could answer SCO, if they just knew what was needed. And they have.

== Publications ==
- Articles in Linux Journal, Linux World, Linux Today, LWN.
- Monthly column in LinuxUser, a UK print publication.
- Contributor to Open Sources 2.0: The Continuing Evolution.
- Jones, Pamela (3 December 2003). "The GPL Is a License, not a Contract". lwn.net. This article has been highly influential in articulating thought on free licenses.

== See also ==
- SCO v. IBM Linux lawsuit
- SCO–Linux disputes
