= Fred von Lohmann =

American lawyer

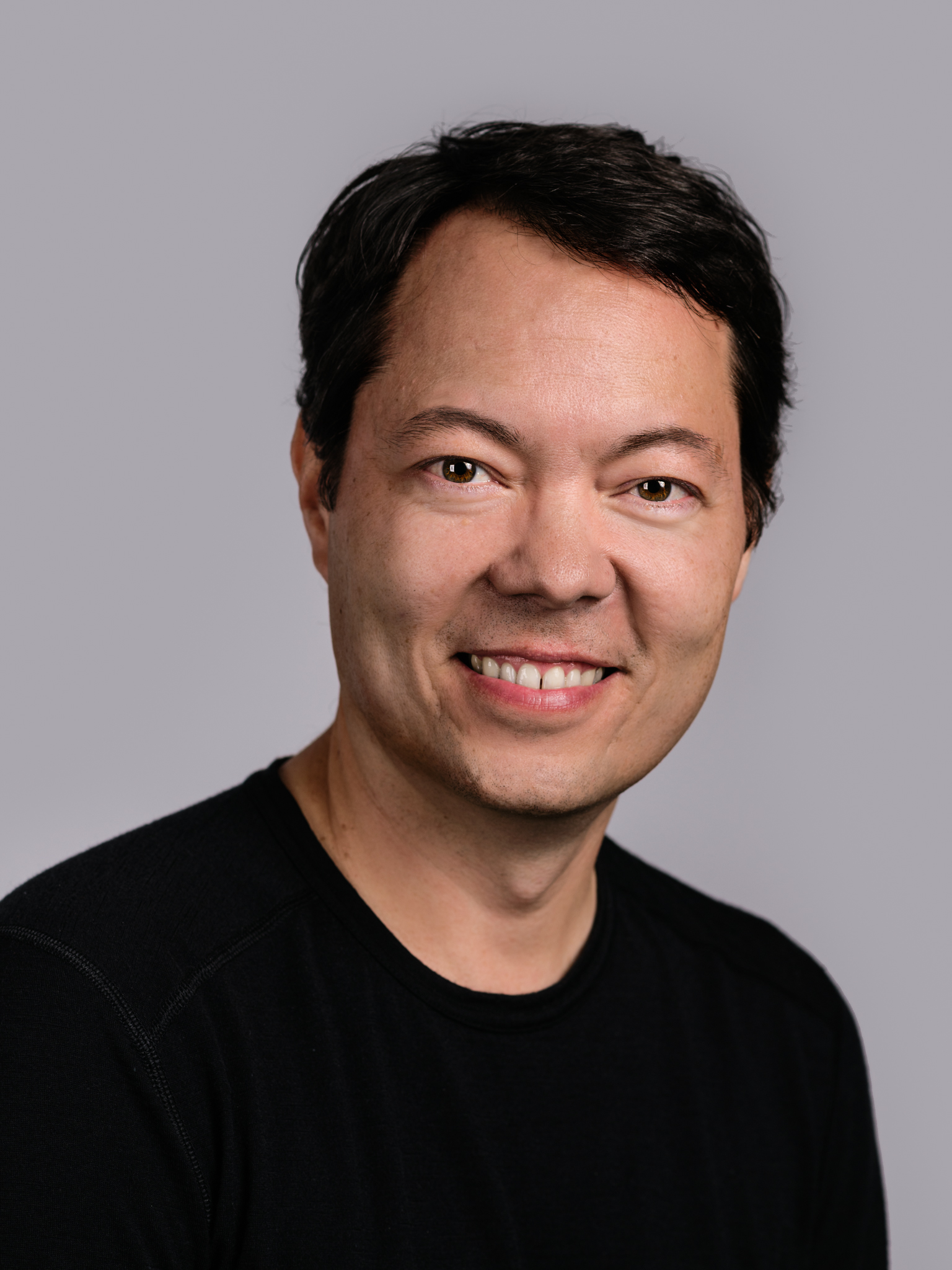
Fred von Lohmann in 2018

Friedrich "Fred" von Lohmann is an American lawyer who used to practice as a legal director at Google.

Before joining Google in July 2010, von Lohmann was a senior staff attorney with the Electronic Frontier Foundation, specializing in intellectual property matters. In that role, he has represented programmers, technology innovators, and individuals in a variety of copyright and trademark litigation. He was also involved in EFF's efforts to educate policy-makers regarding the proper balance between intellectual property protection and the public interest in fair use, free expression, and innovation.

Before joining EFF, von Lohmann was a visiting researcher with the Berkeley Center for Law and Technology and an associate with the international law firm of Morrison & Foerster LLP. He has appeared on CNN, CNBC, ABC's Good Morning America, The NewsHour with Jim Lehrer, and Fox News O'Reilly Factor and has been widely quoted in a variety of national publications. Von Lohmann has received the California Lawyer of the Year Award, the American Library Association's 2010 L. Ray Patterson Copyright Award and recognition as one of 2010's "25 Most Influential People in IP" by both The American Lawyer and Billboard magazines. Von Lohmann has an A.B. from Stanford University and a J.D. from Stanford Law School.
