= Groklaw =

Legal website

- Screenshot of Groklaw on June 18, 2008
- Website type: Law
- Available in: English
- Owner: Pamela Jones
- Creator: Pamela Jones
- Website: http://groklawstatic.ibiblio.org/ – https://web.archive.org/web/20240704230252/http://www.groklaw.net/
- Commercial: No
- Launched: May 16, 2003; 23 years ago
- Current status: discontinued

Groklaw was a website that covered legal news of interest to the free and open source software community. Started as a law blog on May 16, 2003, by paralegal Pamela Jones ("PJ"), it covered issues such as the SCO–Linux lawsuits, the EU antitrust case against Microsoft, and the standardization of Office Open XML.

Jones described Groklaw as "a place where lawyers and geeks could explain things to each other and work together, so they'd understand each other's work better".

Its name derives from "grok", roughly meaning "to understand completely", which had previously entered geek slang.

Other topics covered included software patents, DMCA, the actions of the RIAA against alleged illegal file sharers, and actions against free and open software such as Android and Linux.

== Origins ==
According to a 2003 interview with Jones, the blog was started to cover legal news and to explain it to the tech community.

The first article, titled "The Grokster Decision – Ode To Thomas Jefferson", was about the effect of P2P on the music industry, and the then-recent judgement in MGM Studios, Inc. v. Grokster, Ltd. by Judge Steven Wilson in favor of the defendants. The article also covered the previous Napster decision, and why it was different, causing Napster to be shut down. The article included a quotation from Thomas Jefferson and references to David Boies, who was Napster's attorney.

The second post, on May 17, 2003, also covered legal issues – the SCO v. IBM lawsuit – titled "SCO Falls Downstairs, Hitting its Head on Every Step". It criticized Caldera Systems for the way they were handling the suit outside of court, and quoted Bruce Perens, Richard Stallman, Steve Ballmer, and Linus Torvalds. It ended:

David Boies has agreed to represent SCO. I am trying to remind myself that our legal system is predicated on lawyers sometimes representing people they don't personally admire, and the system really does depend on someone being willing to take on unpopular clients. I know Boies doesn't use email, or at least he didn't the last time I checked. So maybe he doesn't quite get the tech ... ah, hang it all, there's no way around it: I feel bad he's chosen to represent them, especially after I posted an Ode singing his praises, and I hope he loses.

The blog soon became popular with the free software and open source communities and others, and attracted a community of volunteers and commenters. Its popularity caused it to outgrow Radio Userland, and on November 22, 2003, the standalone Groklaw website, hosted by ibiblio and using Geeklog software, was up and running.

== Main focus ==
Jones's writing came to focus mainly on the Caldera Systems v. IBM litigation (Caldera Systems changed its name to The SCO Group during this time). Other issues were explored, including intellectual property and patent issues (for example, Microsoft's IP claims against Linux, and the drafting of the GPL version 3). Groklaw was known for its contributors' ability to explain complex legal issues in simple terms, and for the research used in putting together articles. Members of the Groklaw community attended court hearings and interviewed movers and shakers in the software/IP world.

The site became a community effort. While Jones understood law, she was not a programmer. Many readers were techies, however, and when technical issues arose they provided relevant comments. This enabled Groklaw to solicit guest commentary on issues such as:

- Linux kernel coding practices
- C language programming
- Operating systems programming
- Operating systems history
- Standards organizations

Each of these issues appeared to have some application to the SCO v. IBM case, and most were revisited many times. Additional topics included later lawsuits by The SCO Group against Daimler Chrysler, AutoZone, and Novell, the countersuit by Red Hat, and their implications and Microsoft's attempt to fast-track OOXML as an International Organization for Standardization (ISO) standard.

== Awards ==
Groklaw was cited by the attorneys for several firms in law journal articles. It also won awards:

- 2012 – ABA Journal Blawg 100
- 2010 – The Electronic Frontier Foundation (EFF) Pioneer Award
- 2009 – Top 200 Tech Blogs: The Datamation 2009 List "The famed Groklaw is still going strong, far past the SCO case that first brought the blog to prominence."
- 2008 – The Award for Projects of Social Benefit – The Free Software Foundation (FSF)
- 2007 – Knowledge Masters Award for Innovation – Knowledge Trust and the Louis Round Wilson Academy
- 2007 – Best FUD Fighter – Google-O'Reilly Open Source Awards
- 2005 – Best News Site – ConsortiumInfo*.org – Pamela Jones/Groklaw: Best Community Site or Blog (Non-Profit)
- 2005 – Best Blogger of the Year – Dana Blankenhorn, Corante
- 2004 – Best Website of 2004 – The Inquirer

== Editorial stance ==
Groklaw was the personal creation of Jones, and it published both news and opinion articles from a self-described pro-FOSS, anti-FUD perspective.

While articles meticulously followed SCO's litigation activities, they were accompanied by reader-submitted comments that were "overwhelmingly pro-Linux and anti-SCO."

== Media controversy ==
Jones was widely respected by journalists and people inside the Linux community. Steven J. Vaughan-Nichols wrote, "Jones has made her reputation as a top legal IT reporter from her work detailing the defects with SCO's case against IBM and Linux. Indeed, it is no exaggeration to say that her work has contributed enormously to everyone's coverage of SCO's cases."

Despite the high regard of Jones's journalist peers and the Linux community (or, possibly, in part because of it), a number of prominent attacks against Groklaw and Jones occurred. These attacks were documented and addressed in detail on Groklaw and other web sites, and also in court as part of the SCO litigation.

For the first two years of Groklaw, Jones worked anonymously, signing her articles only as "PJ". During the first week of May 2005, Linux World published an exposé by Maureen O'Gara claiming to unmask Jones. Two weeks before O'Gara's publication, SCO Group CEO Darl McBride said that SCO was investigating Jones's identity. The article included alleged, but unverified, personal information about Jones, including a photo of Jones's supposed house and purported addresses and telephone numbers for Jones and her mother. After a flood of complaints to the publisher, lobbying of the site's advertisers, and claims of a denial-of-service attack launched against the Sys-Con domain, Linux Business News' publisher Sys-Con issued a public apology, and said they dropped O'Gara and her LinuxGram column. Despite this assertion, O'Gara remained with Sys-Con; as of 2009, she is the Virtualization News Desk editor at Sys-Con Media, who describe her as "[o]ne of the most respected technology reporters in the business" and has her work published in multiple magazines owned by Sys-Con Media.

McBride and Blake Stowell, corporate communications director at SCO, also denigrated Jones and claimed that she worked for IBM. Jones denied this allegation, as did IBM in a court filing. During an SCO conference call on April 13, 2005, McBride said, "The reality is the web site is full of misinformation, including the people who are actually running it" when talking about Groklaw, adding also "What I would say is that it is not what it is purported to be". Later developments in the court cases showed that McBride's statements to the press regarding the SCO litigation had limited credibility; very few such statements were ever substantiated and most were shown to be false. For example, McBride claimed that SCO owned the copyrights to UNIX, and SCO filed suit to try to enforce these claims. The outcome went against McBride's claims. The jury found that SCO had not purchased these copyrights. SCO appealed this ruling and lost. McBride also made a claim to the press that there was a "mountain of code" misappropriated to create Linux. When SCO finally presented their evidence of infringement, which centered on nine lines of error name and number similarities in the file errno.h, Judge Wells famously said "Is this all you've got?" Professor Randall Davis of MIT later made a convincing demonstration that no elements of UNIX which might be copyright-protectable were present in the Linux source code.

== Additional projects ==
Anticipating further legal threats against GNU, Linux, and the free software community, Jones launched Grokline, a Unix ownership timeline project, in May 2004. One notable result of the Groklaw/Grokline effort was obtaining and publishing the 1994 settlement in USL v. BSDi, which for over a decade had been sealed by the parties. The document was obtained through a California freedom of information statute (the University of California, as a publicly funded institution, is required by law to make almost all of its documents public), and the release of the settlement answered many questions as to the ownership of the Unix intellectual property.

The Linux documentation project Grokdoc wiki was started in 2004 with the stated goal "to create a useful manual on basic tasks that new users will find simple and clear and easy to follow."

Groklaw extensively covered patent problems with software and hardware and the use of the DMCA against free software ideals, Open standards, digital rights management, GPLv3, and published The Daemon, the GNU & the Penguin, a series of articles by Peter Salus covering the history of Unix, Linux and the GNU project.

It covered the Oracle v. Google lawsuit in which Oracle alleged that Google's Android platform infringed copyrights and patents related to Java.

== Later history ==
In January 2009, Groklaw entered a second phase, focusing on consolidation and cleanup of the legal history collected on the site.

In April 2010, Groklaw was selected by the Library of Congress for its web archival project, in the category of Legal Blogs.

On April 9, 2011, Jones announced that Groklaw would stop publishing new articles on May 16, 2011, its 8th anniversary, as it had accomplished its original mission of revealing the truth behind the SCO lawsuits.

On May 16, 2011, Jones reaffirmed her desire to step down from writing daily articles and announced that the new editor would be Mark Webbink.

Subsequent to this decision, new patent and copyright based attacks on the Android operating system led to Jones resuming an editorial role, and along with Mark Webbink she moderated and edited the site.

On August 20, 2013, a final article appeared on Groklaw, explaining that due to pervasive government monitoring of the Internet, there could no longer be an expectation of the sort of privacy online that was necessary to collaborate on sensitive topics. Citing the closure of Lavabit earlier that month, Jones wrote "I can't do Groklaw without your input.... and there is now no private way, evidently, to collaborate." and "What I do know is it's not possible to be fully human if you are being surveilled 24/7... I hope that makes it clear why I can't continue. There is now no shield from forced exposure."

During 2020, the site was intermittently unavailable. As of 2022, the home page and parts of the content were still available. As of October 2024, although the domain name is still registered, the landing page displayed a GoDaddy domain-parking page. On 18 July 2025, the groklaw.net site was available and mostly worked with a few odd mis-links. As of 18 August 2025 the domain name points to a crypto gambling site.

== See also ==
- SCO–Linux disputes
- Weblog
- Darl McBride
- Ralph Yarro III
- Canopy Group
- Software patents and free software
