= Red Hat, Inc. v. SCO Group, Inc. =

Lawsuit

Red Hat v. SCO was a lawsuit filed by Red Hat against The SCO Group on August 4, 2003. Red Hat asked for a permanent injunction against SCO's Linux campaign and a number of declaratory judgments that Red Hat has not violated SCO's copyrights.

== Background ==
Beginning in 2003, SCO Group initiated a number of lawsuits and claims that Linux infringed SCO's copyrights and that users and vendors of Linux should be held accountable for these infringements. Some of SCO's wilder statements even suggested that users of Linux could expect legal action from The SCO Group. Red Hat is a long time Linux vendor.

== The lawsuit ==
As a response to these allegations, Red Hat filed suit against SCO in the United States District Court for the District of Delaware on August 4, 2003. According to the filing, Red Hat requested that the court make:

- a permanent injunction against SCO's campaign against Linux
- 2 declaratory judgments, that Red Hat has not violated SCO's copyrights, that Red Hat has not violated SCO's trade secrets and several other claims for relief

SCO replied with both a press release and two letters to Red Hat on the same day; SCO reiterated its claims in the press release ("Linux includes source code that is a verbatim copy of UNIX and carries with it no warranty or indemnification. SCO's claims are true and we look forward to proving them in court."), and the allegations made by Red Hat are denied ("SCO has not been trying to spread fear, uncertainty and doubt to end users."). The letters to Red Hat also hint at possible legal retaliations against Red Hat, saying:

Of course, we will prepare our legal response as required by your complaint. Be advised that our response will likely include counterclaims for copyright infringement and conspiracy. I must say that your decision to file legal action does not seem conducive to the long-term survivability of Linux.

On September 15, 2003, SCO filed a motion to dismiss, claiming there is no actual controversy between SCO and Red Hat and that Red Hat could not establish a reasonable apprehension that SCO will sue it for copyright infringement or misappropriation. In fact they claimed that the statements made by SCO representatives in the press that lead Red Hat to believe so were either misquoted or taken out of context. On the question of false advertising, SCO defended themselves by claiming that its statements were fully protected by the first amendment.

Red Hat wanted to proceed as quickly as possible and start discovery. Red Hat sent their first interrogatories, but on October 2, 2003, The SCO Group also filed a motion to stay discovery until the motion to dismiss was heard. Additionally they filed a motion asking for more time to answer Red Hat's first interrogatories.

For over 4 months, both parties waited for a response of the judge. Finally, Red Hat filed a motion to supplement the record with additional information. The additional information contained two letters sent by The SCO Group to Lehman Brothers, a Red Hat customer. In the first letter SCO once again claimed ownership of Unix and that certain portions of Linux infringe on its Unix copyrights (claims the court found to be untrue in SCO v. Novell). In the second letter SCO threatened legal action if Lehman Brothers did not remedy the infringement. A letter sent by Lehman Brothers' counsel instructed SCO to take this matter up with Red Hat, their supplier of Linux products.

During the next 2 months, Red Hat and SCO fought about whether or not this additional, potentially damaging, information should be entered into the record. That fight came to an end when, in her opinion dated April 6, 2004, Judge Robinson denied SCO's motion to dismiss. Additionally she stayed the lawsuit pending the resolution of the SCO v. IBM lawsuit, which makes the motion to supplement the record, the motion to stay discovery and the motion for more time to answer Red Hat's first interrogatories moot.

On April 21, 2004, Red Hat filed a motion to reconsider the stay, claiming SCO never asked for a stay and that a stay was inappropriate because the issues in the SCO v. IBM case would not solve the issues in the Red Hat v. SCO case. The SCO Group filed several memoranda in opposition of this motion.

On March 31, 2005, Red Hat's motion was denied, and the case was stayed until SCO v. IBM was resolved.

On October 11, 2007, the case was closed with leave to reopen after the SCO group leaves Chapter 11 bankruptcy.

On April 18, 2008, Red Hat filed a claim with the court handling the SCO bankruptcy to have potential libel damages recognized by SCO as a liability if SCO loses future legal action. SCO objected and Red Hat filed again in pursuit of their claim.

=== Court proceedings ===
- August 4, 2003: Original Red Hat complaint against SCO
- April 6, 2004: Court orders a stay pending resolution of the SCO v. IBM case
- April 21, 2004: Motion by Red Hat to reconsider the stay
- March 31, 2005: Red Hat's motion denied

(A complete list of court documents is available at Tuxrocks.)

Ultimately, Red Hat substantively prevailed in this case.

== See also ==
- SCO–Linux disputes
