= SCO Group, Inc. v. DaimlerChrysler Corp. =

Lawsuit

SCO Group v. DaimlerChrysler was a lawsuit filed in the United States, in the state of Michigan. In December 2003, SCO sent a number of letters to Unix licensees. In these letters, SCO demanded that the licensees certify certain things regarding their usage of Linux. DaimlerChrysler, a former Unix user and current Linux user, did not respond to this letter. On March 3, 2004, SCO filed suit against DaimlerChrysler for violating their Unix license agreement, by failing to respond to the certification request made by SCO. The parties agreed to a stipulated dismissal order on December 21, 2004. The case was dismissed without prejudice, but if SCO wished to pursue the timeliness claim again, would have had to pay DaimlerChrysler's legal fees since August 9. On December 29, 2004, SCO filed a claim of appeal notice. On January 31, 2005, the claim of appeal was dismissed.

== History ==
For use on their Cray supercomputer, Chrysler Corporation bought a Unix source license from AT&T on September 2, 1988. A source license allows the licensee to view, modify and use the Unix source code on a number of specific machines (designated CPUs).

Through a number of acquisitions, The SCO Group became the licensing agent that handled Unix source licenses. Chrysler Motors Corporations merged with Daimler-Benz in 1998 forming DaimlerChrysler.

== Background information ==
The licenses sold by AT&T allow the licensor to ask for certification regarding the use of the licensed product.

On [SCO's] request, but not more frequently than annually, LICENSEE shall furnish to [SCO] a statement, certified by an authorized representative of LICENSEE, listing the location, type and serial number of all DESIGNATED CPUs hereunder and stating that the use by LICENSEE of SOFTWARE PRODUCTS subject to this Agreement has been reviewed and that each such SOFTWARE PRODUCT is being used solely on DESIGNATED CPUs (or temporarily on back-up CPUs) for such SOFTWARE PRODUCTS in full compliance with the provisions of this Agreement.

The SCO Group invoked their right to ask for certification on December 18, 2003. In addition to the certification specified in the license, SCO also instructed the Unix licensees to certify their use of Linux, a competing operating system.

DaimlerChrysler did not respond to this letter. In fact, it is possible that DaimlerChrysler never received it; it was addressed to Chrysler Motors Corporation at 12800 Oakland Avenue in Highland Park, Michigan, but Chrysler Corporation (as it was then known) had announced the move of its Highland Park headquarters in 1992, and famously moved into a massive, 4,400,000 sq ft (410,000 m^{2}) headquarters complex (1000 Chrysler Drive) in nearby Auburn Hills between 1993-1996. The company closed down its Highland Park facilities in 1997.

The name of the company, too had changed: "Chrysler Motors Corporation" had become part of DaimlerChrysler when it merged with Daimler-Benz AG in 1998. The former Chrysler operations were now referred to informally as "the Chrysler Group", but were legally known as DaimlerChrysler Motors Company LLC.

== The lawsuit ==
On March 3, 2004, The SCO Group filed a breach of contract lawsuit against DaimlerChrysler in the Circuit Court for Oakland County. In its complaint, SCO claimed that DaimlerChrysler refused to comply with the terms of the license. SCO also speculated that DaimlerChrysler broke the licensing agreement when they moved to the Linux operating system and that this is the reason why they refused to certify.

DaimlerChrysler responded with a motion for summary judgment on April 15, 2004. DaimlerChrysler claimed that the letter sent by SCO asked for certifications that were not agreed upon in the original licensing agreement, such as certifications about the use of Linux. Additionally DaimlerChrysler claimed that the original licensing agreement does not mention a specific time in which a licensee should respond to a certification request. DaimlerChrysler also told the court that it had not been contacted by SCO after receiving the letter, instead SCO filed suit without further attempts to receive any certifications.

At the same time, DaimlerChrysler also responded by certifying their use of Unix, according to the provisions specified in the original licensing agreement. In this certification DaimlerChrysler revealed that they have not used Unix for over 7 years.

On August 9, 2004, Judge Chabot granted the summary disposition almost completely. The only remaining issue on the case was whether DaimlerChrysler's response was submitted in a timely manner. On November 17, 2004, SCO moved to stay its suit pending SCO v. IBM case, but was denied.

The parties agreed to a stipulated dismissal order on December 21, 2004. The case was dismissed without prejudice, but if SCO wishes to pursue the timeliness claim again, it must pay DaimlerChrysler's legal fees since August 9. On December 29, 2004, SCO filed a claim of appeal notice. On January 31, 2005, the claim of appeal was dismissed.
