= Xsun =

- Developer(s): Sun Microsystems
- Initial release: November 1993; 31 years ago
- Operating system: Solaris
- Type: X Window System

Xsun is an X Window System (X11) display server implementation included with Solaris, developed by Sun Microsystems. It replaced the older Xnews server, which supported the display of not only X11 applications, but also NeWS and SunView programs. Xsun discontinued support for these legacy environments, and added support for Display PostScript.

Xsun was first released as part of Solaris 2.3 in November 1993. It was originally based on X11R5; the version included with Solaris 10 is based on X11R6.6.

Solaris 10 includes both Xsun and the X.Org Server, Xorg, the open-source software reference implementation of X, based on X11R7. The Xorg server was the most commonly used display server on x86 systems, while the Xsun server remained the most commonly used on SPARC systems; Xorg support for SPARC was only added in Solaris 10 8/07, and had very limited driver support. The OpenSolaris project stated that the future direction of X support is the X.Org implementation. Oracle Solaris 11, released in November, 2011, includes only the Xorg server (X.Org 1.10.3).

== Design ==
In contrast to XFree86, Xsun implemented kernel-based mode setting for some graphics device drivers.

== See also ==
- OpenWindows
- CDE
