= Platform-independent GUI library =

A PIGUI (Platform Independent Graphical User Interface) package is a software library that a programmer uses to produce GUI code for multiple computer platforms. The package presents subroutines and/or objects (along with a programming approach) which are independent of the GUIs that the programmer is targeting. For software to qualify as PIGUI it must support several GUIs under at least two different operating systems (e.g. just supporting OPEN LOOK and X11 on two Unix boxes doesn't count). The package does not necessarily provide any additional portability features. Native look and feel is a desirable feature, but is not essential for PIGUIs.

== Considerations ==
Using a PIGUI has limitations, such as the PIGUI only deals with the GUI aspects of the program so the programmer responsible for other portability issues, most PIGUIs slow the execution of the resulting code, and programmers are largely limited to the feature set provided by the PIGUI.

Dependence on a PIGUI can lead to project difficulties since fewer people know how to code any specific PIGUI than do a platform-specific GUI, limiting the number of people who can give advanced help, and if the vendor goes out of business there may be no further support, including future OS enhancements, though availability of source code can ease but not eliminate this problem. Also, bugs in any package, including the PIGUI, filter down to production code.

== Alternative approaches ==
Web browsers offer a convenient alternative for many applications. Web browsers utilize HTML as a presentation layer for applications hosted on a central server, and web browsers are available for pretty much every platform. However, some applications do not lend themselves well to the web paradigm, requiring a local application with GUI capabilities. Where such applications must support multiple platforms, PIGUI can be more appropriate.

Instead of using a PIGUI, developers could partition their applications into GUI and non-GUI parts, and implement the GUI parts in the native API. Then, when porting, only the GUI parts need to be rewritten for the new platform. There are some software developers who recommend this course of action, as it produces a better fit on each platform and eliminates the overhead often associated with PIGUI toolkits. Obviously, this may require more effort in both the initial development and in ongoing maintenance (no single base of source code). It also means learning how to code for every target platform, which is not (usually) a trivial task, hence the market for PIGUI packages.

== User interface approaches ==
Most, if not all, PIGUI packages take one of three approaches to providing platform independence. The two most common approaches are the `layered' and the `emulated' user interface but an up-and-coming approach is `API emulated' interface.

Packages using a layered interface access native, third party, GUI-building toolkits to provide the look-and-feel compliance for each particular GUI. Layered user interfaces have the advantage that, since they depend on other products which concentrate on a single GUI, they have to provide less software (and, hence, are usually less expensive) than emulated interfaces. Layered interfaces are also more likely to get the native look-and-feel correct on all platforms.

In an emulated user interface, the PIGUI's resultant code produces low-level calls and all the look-and-feel compliance is handled by the PIGUI software itself (e.g., for OpenWindows support, the software would NOT produce an XView program that must be compiled with the XView toolkit; the software would produce code that interfaces directly with X intrinsics). To provide an emulated user interface, a package provider has to develop a lot of extra code for look-and-feel support. Emulated user interfaces have the advantage that someone on a X11 workstation, for example, can see how the Macintosh-style UI will look (since the look-and-feel is part of the product). Emulated interfaces have the opportunity to provide a faster GUI than does a layered interface; in addition, it does not require purchase of (or learn how to use) other packages to build GUI software.

A third approach to platform independence is emulating one of the supported target's APIs (usually, the Microsoft Windows API) to target other GUIs. With one of these products, one would program using the emulated API and the code would be (to the extent to which the product provides portability) portable to other GUIs.

== Features ==
PIGUI packages are pretty similar in their basic functionality; they each provide subroutines or objects that allow the user to build windows, buttons (regular as well as radio buttons and check boxes), menus, and the like. Some areas of differentiation are:

- support for the platforms needed,
- the choice of implementation language,
- availability of source code,
- support for printers and other devices,
- support for various character encoding schemes including Unicode,
- capability to support draw-package-like features,
- bitmap (and icon) support,
- the approach to platform independence,
- nifty high-level widgets, and
- price (complete price including royalties and distribution charges),
- some packages include features for rendering graphics, or handling vector graphics, which are useful for creating custom designs.

== See also ==
- List of platform-independent GUI libraries
- List of PIGUI packages
- Graphical user interface
