= OLIT =

Widget toolkit

OLIT (OPEN LOOK Intrinsics Toolkit ) is a widget toolkit from Sun Microsystems introduced in 1988, providing an OPEN LOOK user interface for X Window System applications. It provides an Xt application programming interface for the C programming language, providing an easy way for those familiar with Xt programming to implement the OPEN LOOK look and feel.

OLIT became obsolete when Sun abandoned OPEN LOOK as part of the UNIX industry's COSE initiative, in favor of Motif (the basis of CDE), which in turn was later superseded by GTK (the basis of GNOME).

== See also ==
- XView
- MoOLIT
- OpenWindows
