= ToolTalk =

Interapplication communications system developed by Sun Microsystems

ToolTalk is an interapplication communications system developed by Sun Microsystems (SunSoft) in order to allow applications to communicate with each other at runtime.

Applications supporting ToolTalk can construct "high-level" messages and hand them off to the system's ToolTalk server, which determines the proper recipients and (after applying permission checks) forwards the message to them. Although originally available only on SunOS and Solaris, ToolTalk was chosen as the application framework for the Common Desktop Environment (CDE) and thus became part of a number of Unix distributions as well as OpenVMS.

While ToolTalk had "object oriented" and "procedural" messages and a complex "pattern" structure which allowed dispatch of messages to processes based on object names, message names, and parameter types, actual desktop protocols never took full advantage of its power. Simpler pattern-matching systems like Apple Computer's AppleScript system did just as well.

The D-Bus standard has superseded ToolTalk in some Unix-like desktop environments.
