= XView =

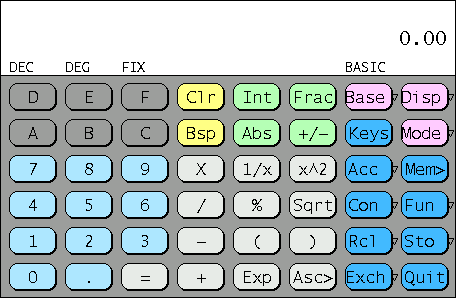
SunOS XView calctool

X Window System graphics stack

XView is a widget toolkit from Sun Microsystems introduced in 1988. It provides an OPEN LOOK user interface for X Window System applications, with an object-oriented application programming interface (API) for the C programming language. Its interface, controls, and layouts are very close to that of the earlier SunView window system, making it easy to convert existing applications from SunView to X. Sun also produced the User Interface Toolkit (UIT), a C++ API to XView.

XView provides a semi-futuristic hi-tech user interface for X Window System applications which had been standardized by a larger group of manufacturers and software companies as the "OPEN LOOK system's specification".

The XView source code has been freely available since the early 1990s, making it the "first open-source professional-quality X Window System toolkit". XView was later abandoned by Sun in favor of Motif (the basis of CDE), and more recently GTK+ (the basis of GNOME).

SunView was reputedly the first system to use right-button context menus, which are now ubiquitous among computer user interfaces; XView as the first "instance" for X ported the contextual concept to the X Window System.

The last XView releases included true-color patches and XPM/JPEG/PNG patches for the menus and icons. Internationalization (aka. I17N) is supported, but Unicode or UTF-8/16/32 are not, simply because XView is older than them. And, of course, the open-source XView does not support DPS/NeWS/HyperTalk. In modern terms, XView is just a framework supplying a WM and demos.

== XView (open-source) and modern systems ==
Although it is possible to compile XView under modern Unix/X11 systems, it is a 32bit-only toolkit written in C89 which major modern compiler suites might refuse to compile cleanly (especially the olvwm window manager), and the massive changes introduced into many libraries make them (the libraries) incompatible to C89 code, like is the case with the GNU LibC6, although most of the current compilers offer to compile C89 code via the "-std=c89" switch. Making the altered library structures compatible with C89 code is a bit of manual labor, both by adding symlinks into the right places and a bit of changing the code which is intended to be compiled.

In addition to that, restrictive system daemons like SELinux and systemd are likely to make XView exit with errors and SIGSEGV upon startup because they mess around with memory allocation and library loading in a way not compatible with the original UNIX concept.

== using XView on Solaris 10 and 11 and OpenSolaris/Illumos descendants ==
Although Sun had dropped XView from the Solaris releases starting with Solaris 10, they are available as backwards-compatibility packages called OWACOMP (OpenWindows Application COMPatibility), which have once been officially provided by Sun Microsystems. For Solaris 10 and 11 and old RedHat Enterprise Linux releases (which had been officially supported by Sun) there are mirrors of those packages available on http://sourceforge.net/projects/owacomp. Note that those feature XViev 3.3, without DPS support.

== See also ==
- OLIT
- MoOLIT
- OpenWindows
