= UIT =

UIT may refer to:

== Organisations ==
- International Telecommunication Union, an agency of the United Nations responsible for issues that concern information and communication technologies
- Union International de Tir, a former name of the International Shooting Sport Federation
- University of Tromsø – The Arctic University of Norway, (Universitetet i Tromsø – Norges arktiske universitet or UiT)
- University Institutes of Technology
- University Institute of Technology
- Usman Institute of Technology, Karachi, Pakistan
- Ho Chi Minh City University of Information Technology

== Other uses ==
- UIT rail, a standard used for mounting slings and other accessories in competition shooting
- Unit investment trust
- User Interface Toolkit, a C++ application programming interface to Sun's XView
- Ultrasonic impact treatment, a method for surface treatment using ultrasound
