= Olwm =

Stacking window manager software

olwm
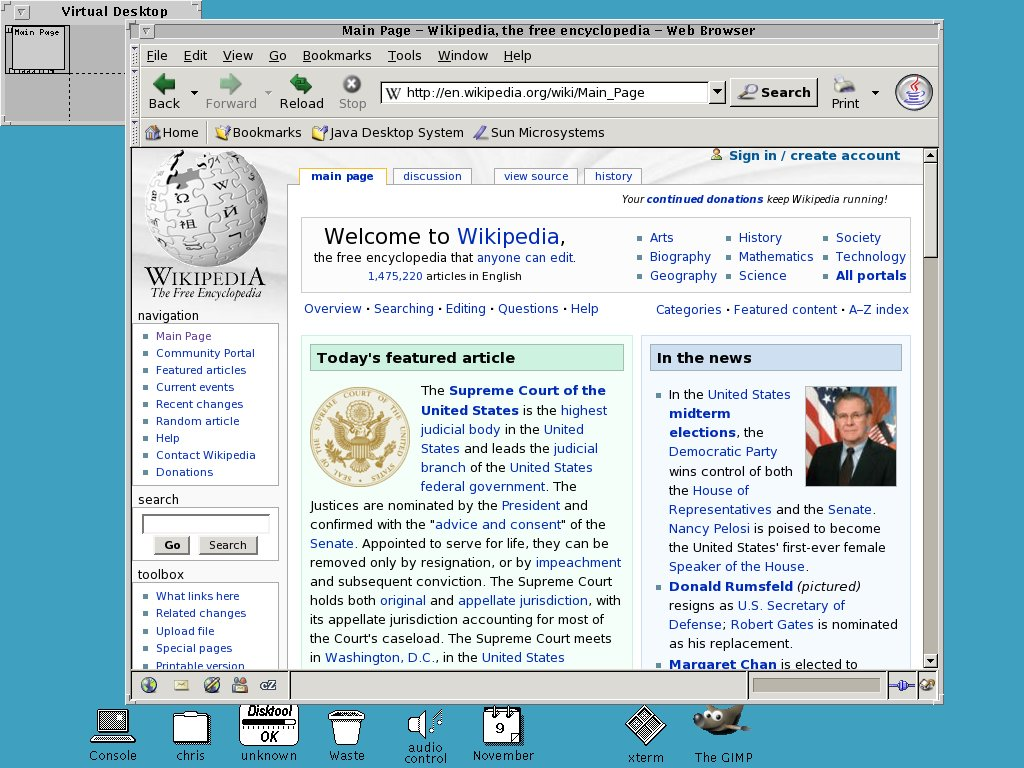
- olvwm and OpenWindows on Solaris
- Developer: Sun Microsystems
- Operating system: Solaris / SunOS
- Platform: IA-32, PowerPC, SPARC, x86, x86-64
- Type: Stacking window manager
- License: custom free software

olwm (OPEN LOOK Window Manager) was the default stacking window manager for OpenWindows, the original X11 desktop environment included with SunOS and Solaris. Its unique characteristic is its implementation of the OPEN LOOK look and feel.

Scott Oaks developed a variant of olwm, called olvwm (OPEN LOOK Virtual Window Manager), which implements a virtual root window with dimensions greater than those of the video display.

== Key features ==
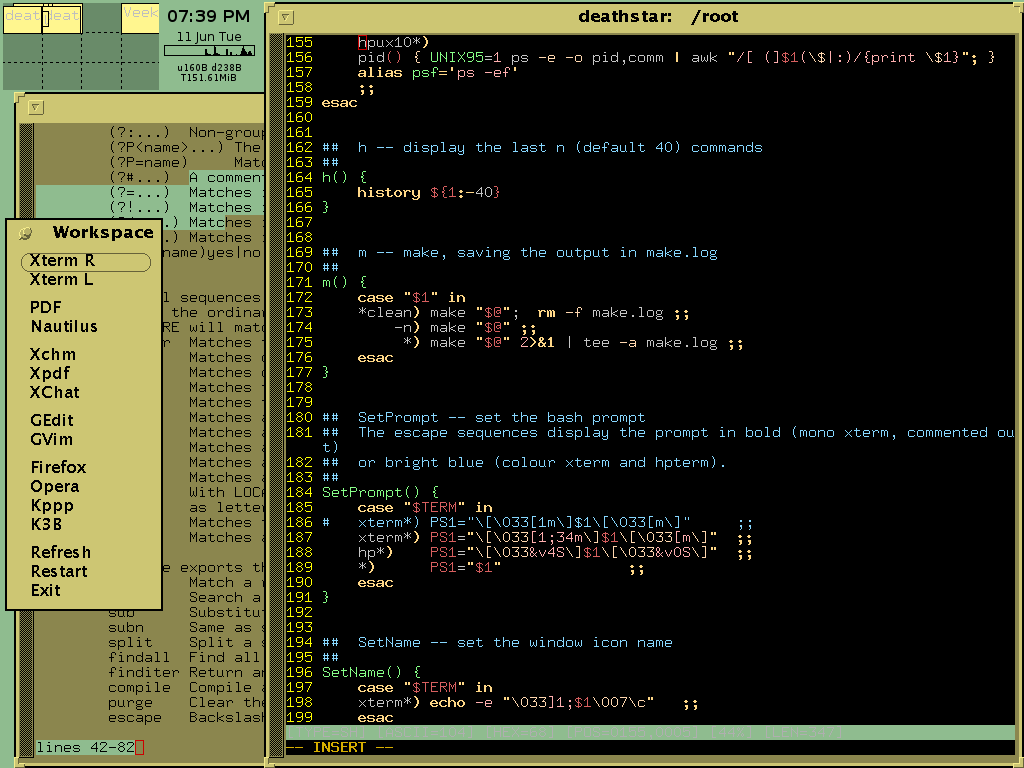
An olvwm-managed desktop with Virtual Desktop Manager (VDM) and two XTerm windows one running Vim using the Desert256 color scheme. A simple menu is pinned to left-hand side of the Workspace. Conky is running next to the VDM, displaying the date, time, and network usage.

The original OLWM features:

- Workspace Menu: allows the user to start programs
- Windows can be automatically started and positioned when the window manager starts, using the config file
- "Focus follows mouse" capability
- Ability to switch and click-into a workspace
- Customizable colors

OLVWM adds:

- Ability to specify no, or minimal, window borders
- Sticky windows
- Virtual Desktop Manager: allows windows to be dragged and dropped to any Workspace. The number of Workspaces is configurable; there are three rows of four Workspaces in the VDM in the lower illustration.
- olvwm includes its own config file, which allows the user to resize and reposition a window using a shortcut key

== See also ==
- SunView
