= Pixar Image Computer =

Graphics designing computer by Pixar

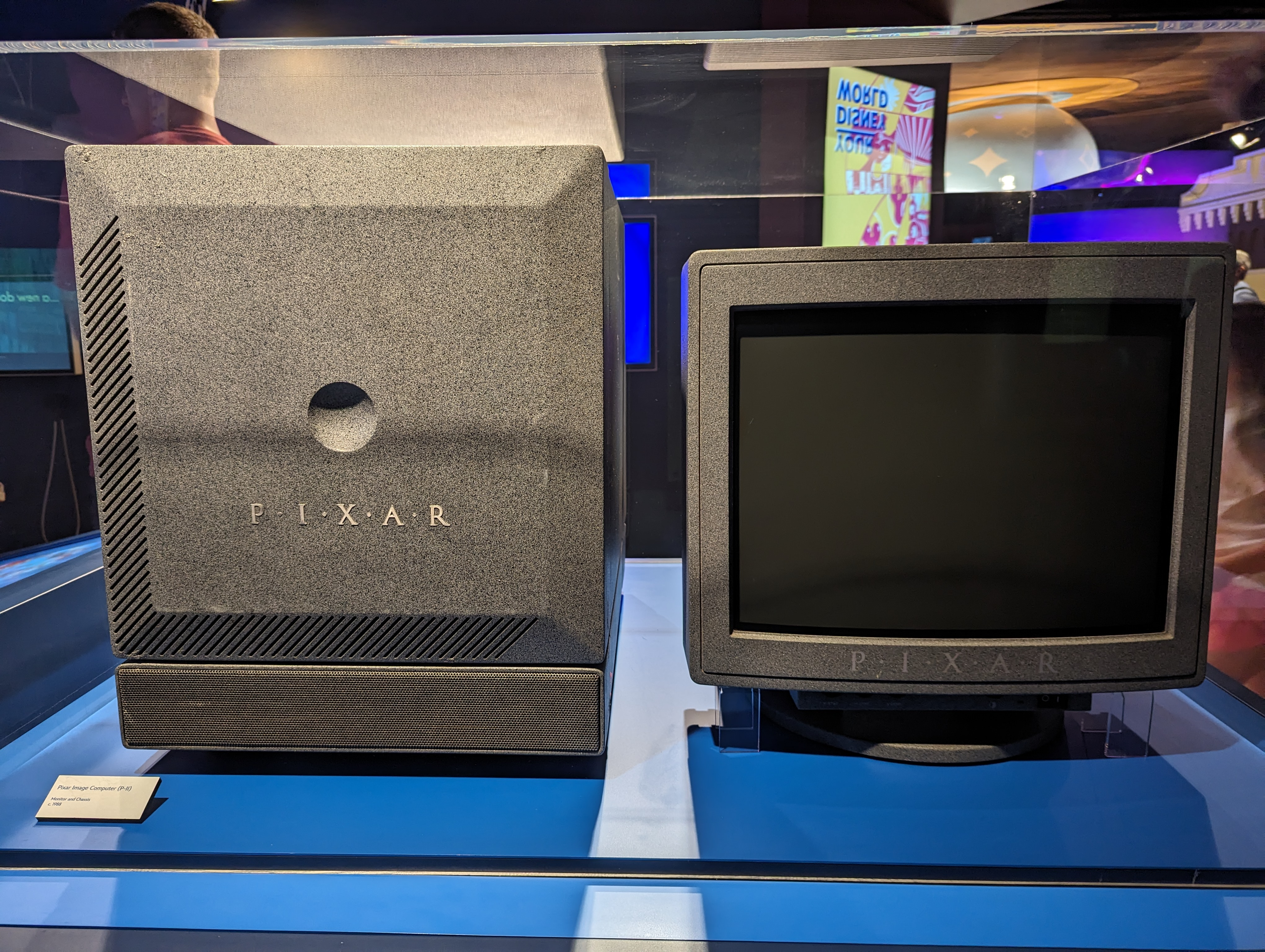
- Chassis and monitor of a P-II model
- Developer: Pixar
- Manufacturer: Pixar
- Type: Image processing
- Released: July 24, 1986; 40 years ago
- Units sold: Fewer than 300

The Pixar Image Computer is a graphics computer originally developed by the Graphics Group, the computer division of Lucasfilm, which later became Pixar. Aimed at commercial and scientific high-end visualization markets, such as medicine, geophysics and meteorology, the original machine was advanced for its time, but sold poorly.

== History ==
=== Creation ===
When George Lucas recruited people from NYIT in 1979 to start Lucasfilm's Computer Division, the group was set to develop digital optical printing, digital audio, digital non-linear editing and computer graphics. Computer graphics quality was just not good enough due to technological limitations at the time. The team then decided to solve the problem by starting a hardware project, building what they would call the Pixar Image Computer, a machine with more computational power that was able to produce images with higher resolution.

=== Availability ===
About three months after their acquisition by Steve Jobs on February 3, 1986, the computer became commercially available for the first time, and was aimed at commercial and scientific high-end visualization markets, such as medical imaging, geophysics, and meteorology. The machine sold for $135,000, but also required a $35,000 workstation from Sun Microsystems or Silicon Graphics (in total, equivalent to $500,000 in 2025). The original machine was well ahead of its time and generated many single sales, for labs and research. However, the system did not sell in quantity.

In 1987, Pixar redesigned the machine to create the P-II second generation machine, which sold for $30,000. In an attempt to gain a foothold in the medical market, Pixar donated ten machines to leading hospitals and sent marketing people to doctors' conventions. However, this had little effect on sales, despite the machine's ability to render CAT scan data in 3D. Pixar did get a contract with the manufacturer of CAT Scanners, which sold 30 machines. By 1988, Pixar had only sold 120 Pixar Image Computers.

In 1988, Pixar began the development of the PII-9, a nine-slot version of the low-cost P-II. This machine was coupled with a very early RAID model, a high performance bus, a hardware image decompression card, 4 processors (called Chaps or channel processors), very large memory cards (VME sized card full of memory), high resolutions video cards with 10-bit DACs which were programmable for a variety of frame rates and resolutions, and finally an overlay board which ran NeWS, as well as the 9-slot chassis. A full-up system was quite expensive, as the 3 GiB RAID was $300,000 alone. At this time in history, most file systems could only address 2 GiB of disk space. This system was aimed at high-end government imaging applications, which were done by dedicated systems produced by the aerospace industry and which cost a million dollars a seat. The PII-9 and the associated software became the prototype of the next generation of commercial "low cost" workstations.

=== Demise and legacy ===
In 1990, the Pixar Image Computer was defining the "state of the art" in commercial image processing. Because the computers were too expensive to sell in large quantities, the decision to sell the hardware to Vicom Systems was the catalyst for Pixar to lay off its hardware engineers and sell the imaging business. Fewer than 300 Pixar Image Computers were ever sold.

"It was built to be part of a pipeline, but as we developed it we realized we were competing with Moore's law with CPU and we probably couldn't get far enough ahead of it to justify it so we actually stopped the hardware effort."

— Ed Catmull, President of Pixar

The Pixar computer business was sold to Vicom Systems in 1990 for $2,000,000. Vicom Systems filed for Chapter 11 within a year afterwards.

Many of the lessons learned from the Pixar Image Computer made it into the Low Cost Workstation (LCWS) and Commercial Analyst Workstation (CAWS) program guidelines in the early and mid-1990s. The government mass deployment that drove the PII-9 development occurred in the late 1990s, in a program called Integrated Exploitation Capability (IEC).

== Design ==
The P-II could have two Channel Processors, or Chaps. The chassis could hold 4 cards. The PII-9 could hold 9 cards (4 Chaps, 2 video processors, 2 Off-Screen Memory (OSM) cards, and an Overlay Board for the NeWS windowing system). NeWS was extended to control the image pipeline for roaming, image comparison, and stereo image viewing.

Each Chap is a 4-way parallel (RGBA) image computer. This was a SIMD architecture, which was good for imagery and video applications. It processed four image channels in parallel, one for red, one for green, one for blue, and one for the alpha channel (whose inventors have connections to Pixar). The Chaps did 16-bit integer arithmetic.

The memory for images only stored 12 bits per color channel (or 48 bits per pixel). 4 bits of extra precision were added to the end when loaded into the Chaps.

A Unix host machine was generally needed to operate it (to provide a keyboard and mouse for user input). The system could communicate image data externally over an 80M per second "Yapbus" or a 2M per second multibus to other hosts, data sources, or disks, and had a performance measured equivalent to 200 VUPS, or 200 times the speed of a VAX-11/780.

== PXR File Format ==
Pixar Image Computer uses the 'Pixar storage standard' PXR File format. PXR file have structure:

1. Header (512 bytes)

2. Tile pointer table (8 × numberTiles bytes)

3. Picture data

Origin of image is left top corner. All data in file use small-endian byte order.

=== Header (512 bytes) ===
Offset (hex)	Bytes	Field name	Description
0 (0x0000)	4	file signature/magic number	0x80 0xe8 0x00 0x00
4 (0x0004)	2	Version	File format version (only have version 0)
6 (0x0006)	246	Ascii description	String for file description
252 (0x00fc)	4	Label Pointer	For continue label if need label longer than 246 bytes. Pointer address from start of file.
256 (0x0100)	160	Unused	
416 (0x01a0)	2	Picture height	Pixel height of whole picture
418 (0x01a2)	2	Picture width	Pixel width of full picture
420 (0x01a4)	2	Tile height	Pixel height of each tile (≤ full picture height)
422 (0x01a6)	2	Tile width	Pixel width of each tile (≤ full picture width)
424 (0x01a8)	2	Picture format	4 bits for which channel is in file: R = bit 0, G = bit 1, B = bit 2, A = bit 3; 4 low bits in low byte.
426 (0x01aa)	2	Picture storage	0 = 8-bit encoded, 1 = 12 bit encoded, 2 = 8 bit dumped, 3 = 12 bit dumped
428 (0x01ac)	2	Blocking factor	Optimum disk transfer chunk
430 (0x01ae)	2	Alpha mode	0 = matted-to-black (pre multiply), 1 = unassociated
432 (0x01b0)	2	x offset	x offset for picture
434 (0x01b2)	2	y offset	y offset for picture
436 (0x01b4)	76	Unused	

=== Tile pointer table (8 × numberTiles bytes) ===
The tile pointer table starts at byte 512 from the start of the file and has 1+ tile pointers.

512 (0x200)	Tile pointer 1	Address of tile 0 (4 bytes)	Length of tile 0 data (4 bytes)
520 (0x208)	Tile pointer 2	Address of tile 1 (4 bytes)	Length of tile 1 data (4 bytes)
...	...	...	...

To calculate the number of tiles for x direction:

1 + (pictureWidth − 1)/tileWidth

and y direction:

1 + (pictureHeight − 1)/tileHeight

Tile order is sweep from left to right, from top to bottom; first tile 0 is at left top of picture and last tile (totalNumberTiles − 1) is at right bottom of image.

=== Dumped & Encoded Pixel Data ===
Picture storage (at 2 bytes at byte 426 from start of file) can have values:

1. 0 - 8-bit channels encoded 2. 1 - 12-bit channels encoded 3. 2 - 8-bit channels dumped 4. 3 - 12-bit channels dumped

Dumped tiles store pixel data direct with order RGBA (4 channels), RGB (3 channels), or R (1 channel, grey image) for whole tile and no have extra byte or mark show end of scan line. Encoded tiles use packets for store image data. Each packet have 2 byte header and encoded pixel data after. Two byte header have flag and count for packet, flag is 4 low bits of byte 2, count is top 4 bits of byte 2 (top bits) combine with 8 bits of byte 1 (low bits) create 12 bit count. Flag have values:

Flag	Count	RGBA	RGB	R	comment
0	no use				end of disk block
1	use	RGBA RGBA ...	RGB RGB ...	R ...	full channel dump
2	use	λRGBA λRGBA ...	λRGB λRGB ...	λR λR ...	full channel run
3	use	A RGB RGB ...	no use	no use	partial channel dump
4	use	A λRGB λRGB ...	no use	no use	partial channel run

For flag value 1 and 3, count is p - 1 number of pixels dumped in packet. For flag value 2 and 4, count is n - 1 number of run lengths in packet, λ is 1 byte (8 bits) store p - 1 number times repeat same pixel. Flag value 3 and 4 only use one A value for that packet and store only RGBA (4 channels) data. One packet never store pixel data from different scan lines but each scan line can use different/any flag.

=== Pixar 12 bit pixel format ===
Pixar Image Computer and PXR use special 12 bit fix point format have range [-1.5; 2.5), with 10 bits of precision (the documentation describes the range as [-0.5; 1.5) plus an "overflow bit").

Bits	Value	Overflow
1010 0000 0000	−1.5	Y
1100 0000 0000	−1.0	Y
1110 0000 0000	−0.5	
0000 0000 0000	0	
0010 0000 0000	0.5	
0100 0000 0000	1.0	
0110 0000 0000	1.5	Y
1000 0000 0000	2.0	Y
1001 1111 1111	2.4995...	Y

=== 16-bit coefficient values ===
Pixar Image Computer also has special 16-bit fixed-point data type (for mảtix value, etc.) have name 'coefficient' with range [-2.0; 2.0) and 14 bits of precision.

bits	value
1000 0000 0000 0000	-2.0
1010 0000 0000 0000	-1.5
1100 0000 0000 0000	-1.0
1110 0000 0000 0000	-0.5
1111 1111 1111 1111	-0.00006103515625
0000 0000 0000 0000	0.0
0010 0000 0000 0000	0.5
0100 0000 0000 0000	1.0
0110 0000 0000 0000	1.5
0111 1111 1111 1111	1.99993896484375

== Use ==
In the early 1990s, the Pixar Computer was used for medical imaging, including MRI and CT scans at Georgetown University and mammography at University of California.

Walt Disney Feature Animation, whose parent company later purchased Pixar in 2006, used dozens of the Pixar Image Computers for their Computer Animation Production System (CAPS) and was using them in production up through Pocahontas in 1995.

== See also ==
- Alias PowerAnimator
- Symbolics Graphics Division
- Wavefront Technologies
- Softimage 3D
- Silicon Graphics
- Sun Microsystems
- Pixar RenderMan
- Computer Animation Production System
