= OpenWindows =

Computer desktop environment

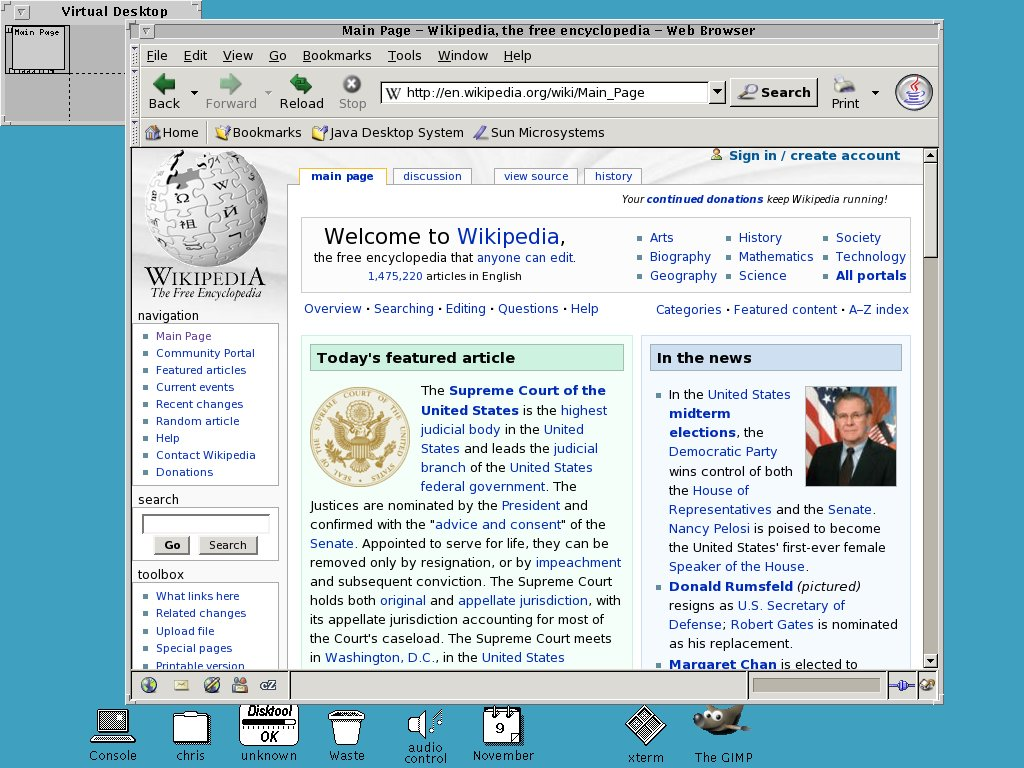
- OpenWindows running the Mozilla web browser. The default DeskSet tools appear at the bottom of the screen.
- Developer: Sun Microsystems
- Initial release: 1989; 37 years ago
- Final release: v3.6.2 / February 2000; 26 years ago
- Operating system: SunOS, Solaris, SVR4
- Platform: PowerPC, SPARC, x86, x86-64
- Type: Desktop environment
- License: Proprietary
- Website: download.oracle.com/docs/cd/E19455-01/806-2901/index.html

OpenWindows is a discontinued desktop environment for Sun Microsystems workstations which combined a display server supporting the X Window System protocol, the XView and OLIT toolkits, the OPEN LOOK Window Manager (olwm), and the DeskSet productivity tools; earlier versions of OpenWindows also supported the NeWS protocol. It implements the OPEN LOOK GUI specification.

OpenWindows was included in later releases of the SunOS 4 and Solaris operating systems, until its removal in Solaris 9 in favor of Common Desktop Environment (CDE) and GNOME 2.0.

== History ==
OpenWindows 1.0 was released in 1989 as a separately licensed addition to SunOS 4.0, replacing the older SunView (originally "SunTools") windowing system. Its core is the "xnews server", a hybrid window server that as its name implies supports both X11 and NeWS-based applications. The server can also display legacy SunView applications, although this functionality was not well-supported. (A standalone NeWS windowing system was also available for a time, but was never the primary SunOS windowing environment.) Starting with SunOS 4.1.1 in 1990, OpenWindows 2.0 was bundled with the operating system.

Solaris 2.0, the first release of the successor to SunOS 4, included OpenWindows 3.0.1. Starting with Solaris 2.3 in late 1993, Sun switched to a standard X11R5 release of X11. It was still called OpenWindows (now version 3.3), but the NeWS protocol was replaced by support for Display PostScript. Support for SunView applications was removed. The graphical look and feel of the window manager and tools is still based on OPEN LOOK. Solaris 7 featured OpenWindows 3.6.1, with an X11R6.4 server.

In 1993, Sun and the other major Unix vendors of the time formed the COSE alliance, seeking further standardization among their Unix releases. The alliance chose the Motif look and feel as its standard, and Sun announced it would phase out OpenWindows in favor of the new COSE desktop environment, which came to be known as CDE.

The last release of OpenWindows is version 3.6.2, included in Solaris 8. With the release of Solaris 9 in 2002, the removal of OpenWindows support from Solaris finally began, as the OPEN LOOK DeskSet tools, OLIT and XView development tools, and olwm were removed. Support for running and displaying applications built with XView or OLIT remains in both Solaris 9 and Solaris 10, but the necessary libraries are no longer included in Solaris 11 and later releases.

== Open source development ==
A project called "OWAcomp", the "OpenWindows Augmented Compatibility Environment", aims to make it possible to use the OpenWindows Deskset environment on Solaris 9, 10 (Sparc and x86) and Linux (x86). There is also a project hosted at SourceForge.net called "openlook" that is based on OpenWindows. As of July 2007, it is quite Linux-centric. Some OpenWindows applications were never released as open source by Sun, so some of these have been rewritten and some are still missing.

== See also ==
- Xsun
