= David S. H. Rosenthal =

British-American computer scientist

David Rosenthal
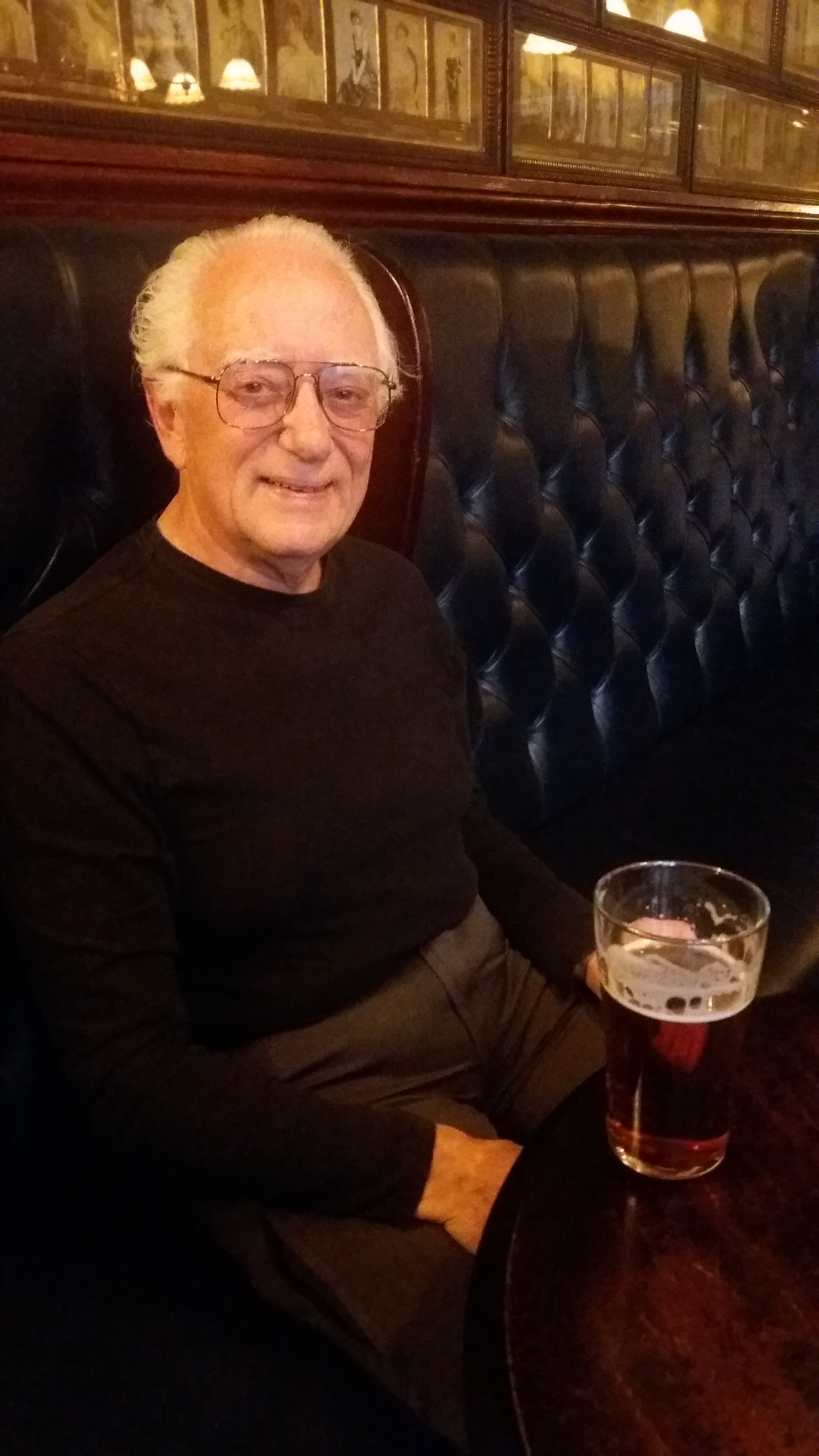
- David S. H. Rosenthal, 10 September 2018
- Born: 1948 (age 77–78); Cambridge, United Kingdom
- Website: blog.dshr.org

David Stuart Holmes Rosenthal (born 1948 in Cambridge, United Kingdom) is a British-American computer scientist.

== Biography ==
Rosenthal is the son of Michael David Holmes Rosenthal and Marjorie Mary "Molly" Rosenthal (both deceased). His brother Mark Geoffrey Thomas Rosenthal ran to be a member of the UK Parliament for Ynys Môn in 2015.

Rosenthal received an MA degree from Trinity College, Cambridge, England, and a PhD from Imperial College, London. In the 1980s he worked on the Andrew Project at Carnegie Mellon University with James Gosling. In 1985 he joined Sun Microsystems, and developed the NeWS Network extensible Window System with Gosling and co-authored a book on it. He developed the Inter-Client Communication Conventions Manual (ICCCM) for the X Window System in 1988, and was issued a patent on a security system for X.

In 1993 he became employee #4 and chief scientist at Nvidia, and then joined Vitria Technology in 1996. In 1999 he rejoined Sun and was a distinguished engineer. He became chief scientist for the LOCKSS project, first at Sun and then since 2002 at Stanford University. His research concerned computer data storage long-term protection techniques. In 2025, he received Paul Evan Peters Award, together with Victoria Reich for their work on LOCKSS.

He holds 23 patents.
