= MoOLIT =

Graphical user interface library

- Original author: Unix System Laboratories
- Developer: MJM Software
- Stable release: 5.1 / December 8, 1995; 30 years ago

MoOLIT (Motif OPEN LOOK Intrinsics Toolkit) is a graphical user interface library and application programming interface (API) created by Unix System Laboratories in an attempt to create a bridge between the two competing look-and-feel styles for Unix workstations at the time: OPEN LOOK and OSF Motif.

The library provides common GUI features such as boxes, menus, lists, and buttons, but allows the choice of which look and feel is implemented at runtime. MoOLIT development was a short-lived project, as the industry was moving towards Motif as the de facto GUI standard, a trend culminating in the COSE initiative in 1993.

MJM Software (a subsidiary of Melillo Consulting, Inc.) licensed the MoOLIT source in 1992 and ported it to Sun, HP, IBM, and DEC platforms. Their MoOLIT 5.1 product includes full Motif support for the traditional OLIT widgets not implemented in the USL version. This version of MoOLIT adds the Motif look and feel to legacy OPEN LOOK applications.
