= User Interface Toolkit =

User Interface Toolkit (UIT) is a discontinued object-oriented layer that was implemented in C++ programming language atop the XView graphical toolkit. It was developed by Sun Microsystems employees Mark Soloway and Joe Warzecha as an internal tools project for Sun's Computer Integrated Manufacturing organization in 1990.

In 1991, Soloway received permission from Sun to contribute the UIT to the Massachusetts Institute of Technology (MIT) X Window System (X11) distribution. Soloway continued development on the UIT, subsequently creating and releasing UITV2 in 1992. The source code is freely available.
