= OPEN LOOK =

Graphical user interface specification

OpenWindows file manager

X Window System graphics stack

OPEN LOOK (sometimes referred to as Open Look) is a graphical user interface (GUI) specification for UNIX workstations. It was originally defined in the late 1980s by Sun Microsystems and AT&T Corporation.

== History ==
OPEN LOOK was created at a time when there was little or no standardization in Unix graphical user interfaces (GUIs); the X Window System was emerging as the likely de facto standard for Unix graphical displays, but its designers had deliberately chosen not to specify any look and feel guidelines, leaving this up to application and window manager developers. At the same time, there was increasing use of GUIs in non-UNIX operating systems: the Apple Macintosh was released in early 1984, followed by Microsoft Windows 1.0 and Amiga Workbench in 1985.

As AT&T contemplated its next major revision to Unix, which would eventually become SVR4, it was believed by many that in order to remain competitive with other operating systems, Unix should have a standard GUI definition. One other concern of the time was legal exposure surrounding intellectual property: in March 1988, Apple filed a lawsuit against Microsoft, claiming that Microsoft had copied the Macintosh look and feel.

The OPEN LOOK specification was a collaboration between Sun and AT&T, who were then partnering in the development of SVR4. Xerox PARC was also credited for having not only done the pioneering work in the industry for graphical user interfaces, but also for contributing to OPEN LOOK's "design, review, implementation, testing, and refinement". Involving Xerox, including licensing technology from them, was felt to serve as protection from any future legal entanglements.

The specification was announced in April 1988. The following month, a group of competitors to AT&T and Sun formed the Open Software Foundation (OSF), as a counter to their collaborative efforts. The OSF created the Motif GUI as its alternative to OPEN LOOK.

== Description ==
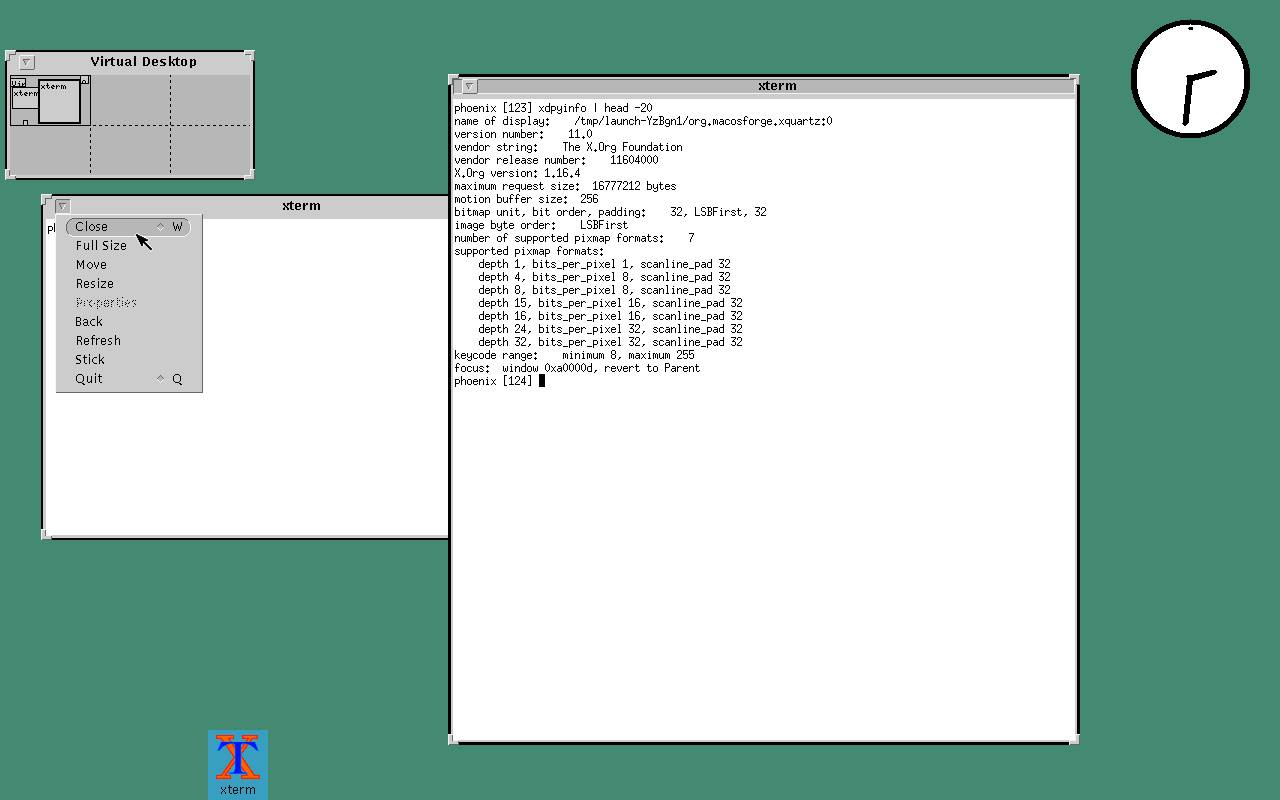
Desktop running olvwm, showing xterms, oclock, the Virtual Desktop manager, and the window menu

OPEN LOOK is distinguished by its obround buttons, triangle glyphs to indicate pull-down and pull-right menus, and "pushpins" which allowed the user to make dialog boxes and palettes stay visible. The overall philosophy was to provide a clean, simple and uncluttered interface, so that the user's focus would be on the application rather than the interface. In fact, the original OPEN LOOK design was black and white only; a "three-dimensional" look and feel with shading was added later, in response to the 3-D style effects in Motif.

It is a definition of a look and feel rather than a specific implementation, so it could actually be implemented with different programming toolkits or even on different underlying window systems; implementations were created for both the X Window System and Sun's NeWS.

Sun developed an X Window System distribution implementing the OPEN LOOK look and feel, calling it OpenWindows. Developers building OPEN LOOK applications could choose between two graphical programming libraries: the OPEN LOOK Intrinsics Toolkit (OLIT) or XView. The former was built on the Xt Intrinsics toolkit common to X; the latter used the same programming interface paradigm as the GUI libraries for Sun's earlier SunView window system, making it relatively easy for developers to migrate applications from SunView to X.

There was also The NeWS Toolkit, or TNT, which as the name implies implemented OPEN LOOK for NeWS applications; support for NeWS applications was removed from OpenWindows in 1993.

In 1990, Unix System Laboratories (USL) inherited OLIT from AT&T along with UNIX. Not long after, the codebase for OLIT diverged as Sun and USL took its development in different directions. Sun continued to enhance its version to make its look and feel more consistent with XView. USL, in an attempt to create an API to make applications GUI independent, developed MoOLIT (from Motif OPEN LOOK Intrinsics Toolkit), which kept the OLIT API, but allowed users to choose which GUI they wanted at run time. The source to MoOLIT was licensed by MJM Software, who ported it to several other Unix platforms. It was used for several years, almost exclusively by AT&T and Lucent Technologies, who wanted to give their existing OPEN LOOK applications a Motif look and feel. It was not widely used elsewhere.

== Demise ==
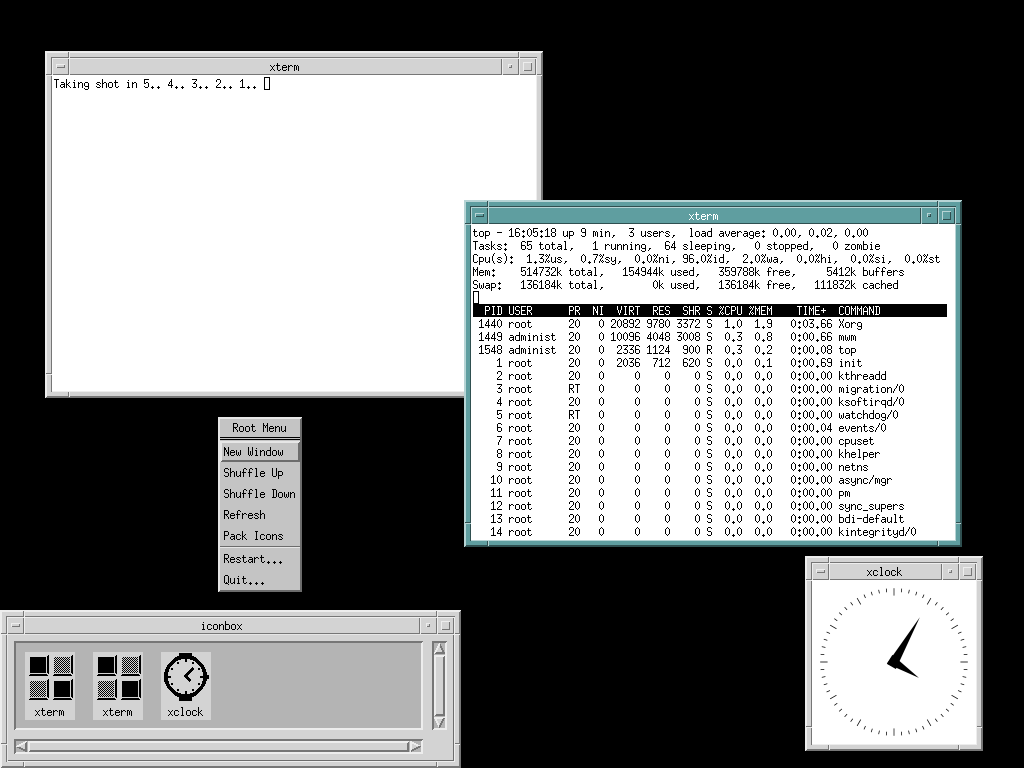
The Motif Window Manager (MWM)

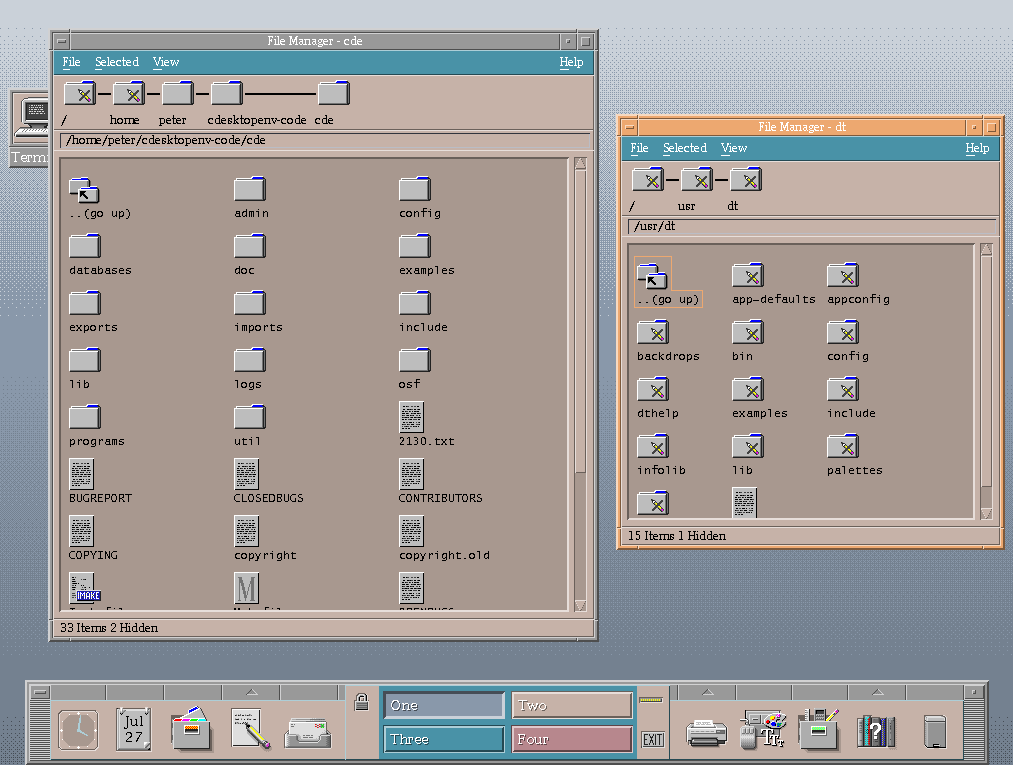
The Common Desktop Environment (CDE)

By June 1993, the major UNIX players, including AT&T and Sun, had decided that a truly unified Unix was necessary in order to better compete against Microsoft and had formed the Common Open Software Environment (COSE) initiative. The unified desktop for this initiative became the Common Desktop Environment (CDE), and the look and feel chosen for it was based on Motif. Sun announced its plans to immediately offer Motif and start retiring OpenWindows, by then the predominant implementation of the OPEN LOOK look and feel.

Sun began by offering the Motif developer toolkit and MWM window manager as a standalone product for use with Solaris until CDE was released in 1995. OpenWindows remained the primary Solaris desktop environment until 1997, when CDE became the primary desktop for Solaris 2.6. Even then, OpenWindows was still included with Solaris and could continue to be used instead of CDE.

When Solaris 9 was released in 2002, development support for XView and OLIT-based applications was finally removed, as were the olwm window manager and the OPEN LOOK versions of the DeskSet productivity tools. Applications already developed using XView and OLIT can still be executed and displayed in both Solaris 9 and 10, but are no longer supported as native applications in Solaris 11.

There are at least two projects continuing development of OPEN LOOK software: "OWAcomp" makes it possible to still use the OPEN LOOK DeskSet tools, as well as compile OPEN LOOK applications; "openlook" is based on OpenWindows code released as open source, but has added additional components that were not open sourced by Sun.
