= SunOS =

Operating system from Sun Microsystems

- Screenshot and graphical interface of SunOS 4.1.4
- Developer: Sun Microsystems
- OS family: Unix (BSD/SVR4)
- Working state: Historic; now marketed as Solaris
- Source model: Closed source
- Initial release: 1982; 44 years ago
- Latest release: 4.1.4 / September 1994; 31 years ago
- Supported platforms: Motorola 680x0, Sun386i, SPARC
- Kernel type: Monolithic kernel
- Default user interface: SunView, OpenWindows
- License: Proprietary (binary only)
- Succeeded by: Solaris

SunOS is a Unix-branded operating system developed by Sun Microsystems for their workstation and server computer systems from 1982 until the mid-1990s. The SunOS name is usually only used to refer to versions 1.0 to 4.1.4, which were based on BSD, while versions 5.0 and later are based on UNIX System V Release 4 and are marketed under the brand name Solaris.

== History ==
SunOS 1 only supported the Sun-2 series systems, including Sun-1 systems upgraded with Sun-2 (68010) CPU boards. SunOS 2 supported Sun-2 and Sun-3 (68020) series systems. SunOS 4 supported Sun-2 (until release 4.0.3), Sun-3 (until 4.1.1), Sun386i (4.0, 4.0.1 and 4.0.2 only) and Sun-4 (SPARC) architectures. Although SunOS 4 was intended to be the first release to fully support Sun's new SPARC processor, there was also a SunOS 3.2 release with preliminary support for Sun-4 systems.

SunOS 4.1.2 introduced support for Sun's first sun4m-architecture multiprocessor machines (the SPARCserver 600MP series); since it had only a single lock for the kernel, only one CPU at a time could execute in the kernel.

The last release of SunOS 4 was 4.1.4 (Solaris 1.1.2) in 1994. The sun4, sun4c and sun4m architectures were supported in 4.1.4; sun4d was not supported.

Sun continued to ship SunOS 4.1.3 and 4.1.4 until December 27, 1998; they were supported until September 30, 2003.

=== Version history ===
SunOS version	Release date	Codebase	Description
Sun UNIX 0.7	1982	UniSoft UNIX v7	Bundled with 68000-based Sun-1 system. No windowing system.
SunOS 1.0	Nov 1983	4.2BSD	Support for 68010-based Sun-1 and Sun-2 systems. Introduced Sun Window System.
SunOS 1.1	Apr 1984	4.2BSD	
SunOS 1.2	Jan 1985	4.2BSD	
SunOS 2.0	May 1985	4.2BSD	Introduced the NFS protocol, Yellow Pages (YP) distributed network information system, Remote Procedure Call (RPC) / eXternal Data Representation (XDR) and virtual file system (VFS) layer using vnodes. Coincided with release of 68020-based Sun-3 hardware.
SunOS 3.0	Feb 1986	4.2BSD	
SunOS 3.2	Sep 1986	Same as 3.0, plus some 4.3BSD and System V IPC	First support for Sun-4 series. Optional System V tape offered utilities and development libraries.
SunOS 3.5	Jan 1988	Same as 3.0, plus some 4.3BSD and System V IPC	
SunOS 4.0	Dec 1988	4.3BSD with System V IPC	New virtual memory system, dynamic linking, automounter, System V STREAMS I/O. Sun386i support.
SunOS 4.0.1	Dec 1988	4.3BSD with System V IPC	
SunOS 4.0.2	Sep 1989	4.3BSD with System V IPC	Sun386i only
SunOS 4.0.3	May 1989	4.3BSD with System V IPC	
SunOS 4.0.3c	Jun 1989	4.3BSD with System V IPC	SPARCstation 1 (Sun-4c) only
SunOS 4.1	Mar 1990	4.3BSD with System V IPC	
SunOS 4.1e	Apr 1991	4.3BSD with System V IPC	Sun-4e only
SunOS 4.1.1	Nov 1990	4.3BSD with System V IPC	Bundled with OpenWindows 2.0
SunOS 4.1.1B	Feb 1991	4.3BSD with System V IPC	
SunOS 4.1.1.1	Jul 1991	4.3BSD with System V IPC	
SunOS 4.1.1_U1	Nov 1991	4.3BSD with System V IPC	Sun-3/3x only
SunOS 4.1.2	Dec 1991	4.3BSD with System V IPC	Support for multiprocessor (SPARCserver 600MP) systems; first CD-ROM-only release.
SunOS 4.1.3	Aug 1992	4.3BSD with System V IPC	
SunOS 4.1.3C	Nov 1993	4.3BSD with System V IPC	SPARCclassic/SPARCstation LX only
SunOS 4.1.3_U1	Dec 1993	4.3BSD with System V IPC	
SunOS 4.1.3_U1B	Feb 1994	4.3BSD with System V IPC	Earliest release for which Y2K compliance patches were available.
SunOS 4.1.4	Nov 1994	4.3BSD with System V IPC	Last release of SunOS 4
SunOS 5.x	Jun 1992	SVR4	See Solaris article.

== "SunOS" and "Solaris" ==
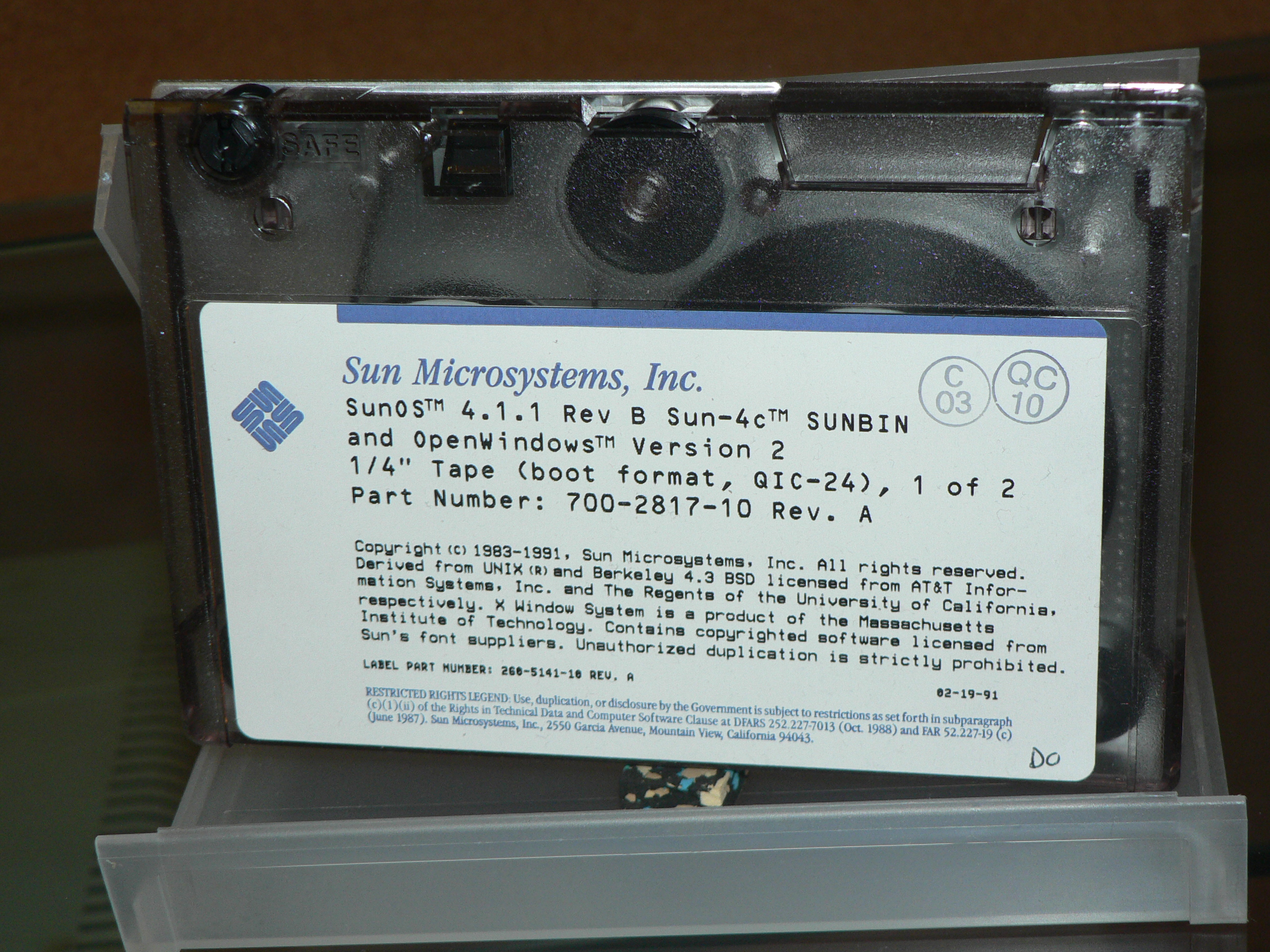
SunOS 4.1.1 tape

In 1987, AT&T Corporation and Sun announced that they were collaborating on a project to merge the most popular Unix flavors on the market at that time: BSD (including many of the features then unique to SunOS), System V, and Xenix. This would become System V Release 4 (SVR4).

On September 4, 1991, Sun announced that its next major OS release would switch from its BSD-derived source base to one based on SVR4. Although the internal designation of this release would be SunOS 5, from this point Sun began using the marketing name Solaris. The justification for this new "overbrand" was that it encompassed not only SunOS, but also the OpenWindows desktop environment and Open Network Computing (ONC) functionality.

Even though the new SVR4-based OS was not expected to ship in volume until the following year, Sun immediately began using the new Solaris name to refer to the currently shipping SunOS 4 release (also including OpenWindows). Thus SunOS 4.1.1 was rebranded Solaris 1.0; SunOS 5.0 would be considered a part of Solaris 2.0. SunOS 4.1.x micro versions continued to be released through 1994, and each of these was also given a Solaris 1.x equivalent name. In practice, these were often still referred to by customers and even Sun personnel by their SunOS release names. Matching the version numbers was not straightforward:

SunOS 4.1.x / Solaris 1.x / OpenWindows releases
SunOS Version	Solaris version	OpenWindows version
4.1.1; 4.1.1B; 4.1.1.1	1.0	2.0
4.1.2	1.0.1	2.0
4.1.3	1.1 SMCC Version A	3.0
4.1.3C	1.1C	3.0
4.1.3_U1	1.1.1	3.0_U1
4.1.3_U1B	1.1.1B	3.0_U1B
4.1.4	1.1.2	3.0_414

Today, SunOS 5 is universally known as Solaris, although the SunOS name is still visible within the OS itself – in the startup banner, the output of the uname command, and man page footers, among other places.

Matching a SunOS 5.x release to its corresponding Solaris marketing name is simple: each Solaris release name includes its corresponding SunOS 5 minor version number. For example, Solaris 2.4 incorporated SunOS 5.4. There is one small twist: after Solaris 2.6, the "2." was dropped from the Solaris name and the SunOS minor number appears by itself. The latest Solaris release is named Solaris 11 and incorporates SunOS 5.11.

== User interface ==
Beginning with SunOS 1.0, the Sun Window System provided a GUI called Suntools, layered on top of lower-level windowing and bitmap libraries; this was renamed SunView in SunOS 3.0. Sun then developed a novel window system called NeWS that used and extended the PostScript language and graphics model. In 1989, Sun released OpenWindows, an OPEN LOOK-compliant X11-based environment which also supported SunView and NeWS applications. This became the default SunOS GUI in SunOS 4.1.1.

== See also ==
- Comparison of BSD operating systems
- Comparison of operating systems
- Illumos
- OpenSolaris
- OpenIndiana
- Solaris (operating system)
- JavaOS
- Unix wars
