= SunView =

Discontinued SunOS windowing system

- SunView environment on a SPARCstation 4 running SunOS 4
- Operating system: SunOS
- Type: windowing system

SunView (Sun Visual/Integrated Environment for Workstations) is a discontinued user interface toolkit and windowing system from Sun Microsystems, launched in 1985, and included as part of its Unix implementation, starting with SunOS Release 3.0. Sun had introduced support in 1983 for a window-based environment known as the Sun Window System, providing the Sunwindows (or SunWindows) window manager and Suntools (or SunTools) user interface toolkit.

SunWindows was one of the first widely used Unix window systems and, unlike later Unix windowing systems, relied on dedicated support in the system kernel, albeit limited to window hierarchy management and therefore being less invasive than other early window system implementations. In SunWindows, graphics device operations were performed by applications and not in the kernel. SunView was introduced as an object-oriented toolkit layer on top of the SunWindows platform to address the increasing complexity of the underlying system and to facilitate the development of user interfaces. SunView ran on Sun's desktop and deskside workstations, providing an interactive graphical environment for technical computing, document publishing, medical, and other applications of the 1980s, on high resolution monochrome, greyscale and color displays.

== Bundled productivity applications ==
SunView includes a full suite of GUI-based productivity applications, including an mail reader, calendaring tool, text editor, clock, preferences, and menu management interface.. The idea of shipping such clients and the associated server software with the base OS was several years ahead of the rest of the industry.

Sun's original SunView application suite was later ported to X, featuring the OPEN LOOK look and feel. Known as the DeskSet productivity tool set, this was one distinguishing element of Sun's OpenWindows desktop environment.

The DeskSet tools became a unifying element at the end of the Unix wars, where the open systems industry was embroiled in a battle which would last for years. As part of the COSE initiative, it was decided that Sun's bundled applications would be ported yet again, this time to the Motif widget toolkit, and the result would be part of CDE. This became the standard for a time across all open systems vendors.

The full suite of group productivity applications that Sun had bundled with the desktop workstations turned out to be a significant legacy of SunView. While the underlying windowing infrastructure changed, protocols changed, and windowing systems changed, the Sun applications remained largely the same, maintaining interoperability with previous implementations.

== Successors ==
SunView was intended to be superseded by NeWS, a more sophisticated window system based on PostScript; however, the actual successor turned out to be OpenWindows, whose window server supported SunView, NeWS and the X Window System. Support for the display of SunView programs was phased out after Solaris 2.2. Sun provided a toolkit for X called XView, with an API similar to that of SunView, simplifying the transition for developers between the two environments.

Sun later announced its migration to the GNOME desktop environment from CDE, marking the end of Sun's 20-year-plus history of using the SunView/DeskSet code base. CDE, including the DeskSet components it used, was open sourced in 2012.
