= Common Open Software Environment =

Operating system standards initiative

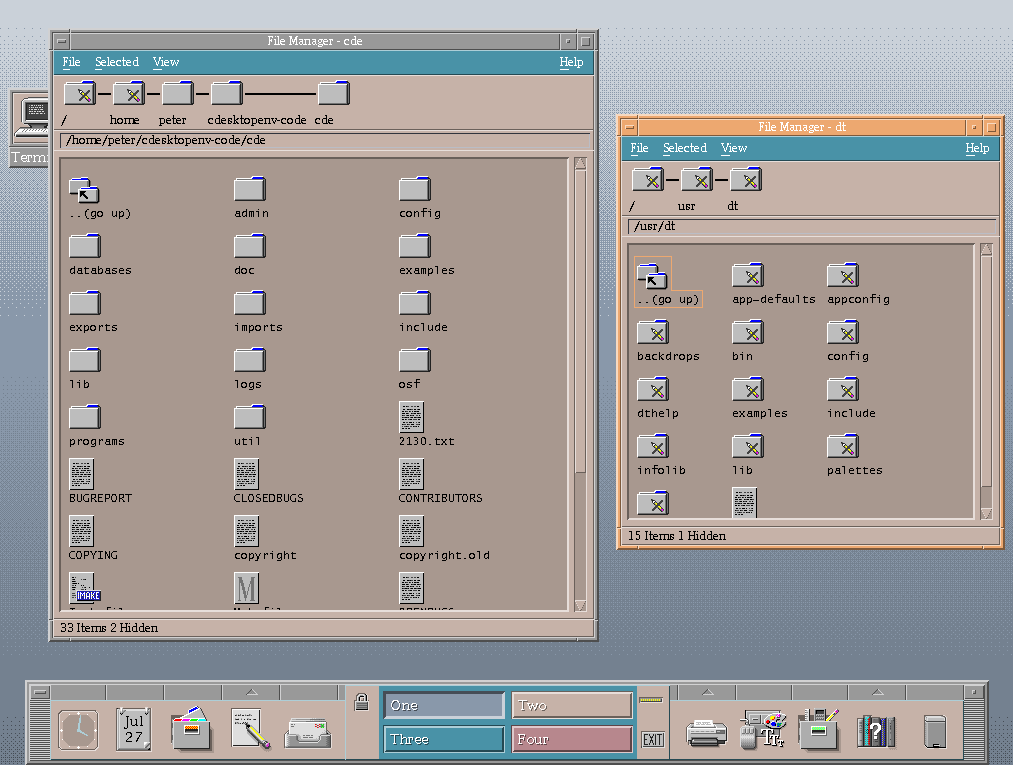
The Common Desktop Environment, one part of the COSE initiative

The Common Open Software Environment (COSE) was an initiative formed in March 1993 by the major Unix vendors of the time to create open, unified operating system (OS) standards.

== Background ==
The COSE process was established during a time when the "Unix wars" had become an impediment to the growth of Unix. Microsoft, already dominant on the corporate desktop, was beginning to make a bid for two Unix strongholds: technical workstations and the enterprise data center. In addition, Novell was seeing its NetWare installed base steadily eroding in favor of Microsoft-based networks; as part of a multi-faceted approach to battling Microsoft, they had turned to Unix as a weapon, having recently formed a Unix-related partnership with AT&T known as Univel.

Unlike other Unix unification efforts that preceded it, COSE was notable in two ways: it was not formed in opposition to another set of Unix vendors, and it was more oriented toward making standards of existing technologies than creating new offerings from scratch.

The initial members, (known as "The Big Six" or "SUUSHI"), were:

- The Santa Cruz Operation
- Unix System Laboratories
- Univel
- Sun Microsystems
- Hewlett-Packard
- IBM

These represented the significant Unix system and OS vendors of the time, as well as the holders of the Unix brand and AT&T-derived source code. They also represented almost all the key players in the two major Unix factions of the late 1980s and early 1990s, the OSF and Unix International (UI). Notable in its absence was OSF co-founder Digital Equipment Corporation; Digital did finally announce its endorsement of the COSE process the following June.

COSE's announced areas of focus were: a common desktop environment; networking; graphics; multimedia; object-based technology; and, systems management. On September 1, 1993 it was also announced that the COSE vendors were developing a unified Unix specification with the support of over 75 companies.

== Unix standardization ==
Unlike OSF or UI, the COSE initiative was not tasked to create or promote a single operating system. Their approach was to instead survey and document the OS interfaces already in use by Unix software vendors of the time. This resulting list, originally known as "Spec 1170", evolved to become what is now known as the Single Unix Specification.

Spec 1170 (no relation to the SPEC benchmarking organization) was named after the results of the first COSE effort to determine which Unix interfaces were actually in use; inspection of a large sample of current Unix applications uncovered 1,170 such system and library calls. As might be expected, the actual number of interfaces cataloged continued to grow over time.

Management of the specification was given to X/Open. In October 1993, it was announced that the UNIX trademark, which was at that time owned by Novell, would be transferred to X/Open. These developments meant that the UNIX brand was no longer tied to one source code implementation; any company could now create an OS version compliant with the UNIX specification, which would then be eligible for the UNIX brand.

== Common Desktop Environment ==
Besides the opening and standardization of the UNIX brand, the most notable product of the COSE initiative was the Common Desktop Environment, or CDE. CDE was an X11-based user environment jointly developed by HP, IBM, and Sun, with an interface and productivity tools based on OSF's Motif graphical widget toolkit.

== Other technology areas ==
Although in the areas of desktop and the OS itself the COSE process was one of unification, in other announced areas, it was decided to endorse existing technologies from both camps rather than pick one. For example, the announced direction for networking was for all participants to sell, deliver and support OSF's DCE, UI's ONC+, and a NetWare client.

Other areas were addressed in very broad terms. For object-based technology, CORBA was called out as the underlying technology, but method of implementation was left to the individual companies.

== Legacy ==
In March 1994 UI and OSF announced their merger into a new organization, which retained the OSF name. The COSE initiative became the basis of the new OSF's "Pre-Structured Technology" (PST) process. These efforts in turn eventually became the responsibility of The Open Group, an entity formed by the merger of the new OSF and X/Open in 1996.

In the end, the most significant product of the COSE process was the creation of a universally-recognized single UNIX standard and an independent organization to administer it. It marked the end of Sun's OPEN LOOK graphical environment in favor of a Motif-based desktop, at the same time making the latter a standard rather than a proprietary toolkit. Although it had less impact on the other standardization areas it originally intended to address, it nonetheless had a major influence on the future of Unix extending far beyond the 12 months of its independent existence.
