= List of Unix systems =

Historical flow chart of Unix and Unix-like variants.

Each version of the UNIX Time-Sharing System evolved from the version before, with version one evolving from the prototypal Unix. Not all variants and descendants are displayed.

== Research Unix Systems and descendants ==
- "Ken's new system" (Unics → Unix) (1969) (asm PDP-7)
- UNIX Time-Sharing System v1 (1971) (asm PDP-11)
- UNIX Time-Sharing System v2 (1972)
- UNIX Time-Sharing System v3 (1973)
- UNIX Time-Sharing System v4 (1973) (C)
- UNIX Time-Sharing System v5 (1974)
  - UNSW 01 (1978)
- UNIX Time-Sharing System v6 (1975)
  - 1BSD (1978)
  - AUSAM (1978)
  - IS/1 (1977)
  - LSI-UNIX (1977)
  - Mini-UNIX (1977)
  - PWB/UNIX 1.0 (1977)
    - USG 1.0
      - CB UNIX 1
  - Wollongong Unix (1977)
- UNIX Time-Sharing System v7 (1979)
  - 2BSD (1979)
  - UNIX/32V (1979) (VAX)
    - 3BSD (1979)
    - UNIX System III (1981)
  - UNIX/V7M (1979)
- UNIX Time-Sharing System v8 (1985)
- UNIX Time-Sharing System v9 (1986)
- UNIX Time-Sharing System v10 (1989)
  - IX Multilevel-Secure UNIX System (1992)

The versions leading to v7 are also sometimes called Ancient UNIX. After the release of Version 10, the Unix research team at Bell Labs turned its focus to Plan 9 from Bell Labs, a distinct operating system released in 1993, and later on Inferno. All versions of BSD from its inception up to 4.3BSD-Reno are based on Research Unix, with versions starting with 4.4 BSD and Net/2 instead becoming Unix-like. Furthermore, 8th Edition Research Unix and on-wards had a close relationship to BSD. This began by using 4.1cBSD as the basis for the 8th Edition. In a Usenet post from 2000, Dennis Ritchie described these later versions of Research Unix as being closer to BSD than they were to UNIX System V, which also included some BSD code:

Research Unix 8th Edition started from (I think) BSD 4.1c, but with enormous amounts scooped out and replaced by our own stuff. This continued with 9th and 10th. The ordinary user command-set was, I guess, a bit more BSD-flavored than SysVish, but it was pretty eclectic.

== Commercial AT&T Unix Systems and descendants ==
Each of the systems in this list is evolved from the version before, with UNIX System III evolving from both the UNIX Time-Sharing System v7 and the descendants of the UNIX Time-Sharing System v6.

- UNIX System III (1981)
- UNIX System IV (1982)
- UNIX System V (1983)
  - UNIX System V Release 2 (1984)
  - UNIX System V Release 3.0 (1986)
  - UNIX System V Release 3.2 (1987)
  - UNIX System V Release 4 (1988)
    - UnixWare 1.0 (System V Release 4.2) (1992)
    - UnixWare 2.0 (System V Release 4.2MP) (1995)
    - UnixWare 7 (System V Release 5) (1998)
      - OpenServer 6.0 (System V Release 5) (2005)

=== Forks and ports ===
- 386/ix
- AIX
- Amdahl UTS
- Amiga Unix
- Atari System V
- A/UX
- BOS (Bull)
- CLIX (Unix version)
- COSIX
- DC/OSx
- DG/UX
- DYNIX/ptx
- EWS-UX
- ESIX
- HP-UX
- illumos
- IS
- IRIX
- IX/370
- MIPS RISC/os
- NEWS-OS
- OSF/1
- PC/IX
- PC-UX
- PNX
- Project Monterey
- SCO Unix
- SCO OpenServer (Note: Registered as Unix 93 “single and Multi-processor Industry Standard Intel architecture platform”.)
- SINIX
- Solaris
- SUPER-UX
- Tru64 UNIX
- UNICOS
- Uniplus+
- Unix/NS
- UnixWare
- UXP/DS
- Venix
- XENIX

== BSD systems ==
The Berkeley Software Distribution (BSD) was originally derived from Unix, using the complete source code for Sixth Edition Unix for the PDP-11 from Bell Labs as a starting point for the First Berkeley Software Distribution, or 1BSD. A series of updated versions for the PDP-11 followed (the 2.xBSD releases). A 32-bit version for the VAX platform was released as 3BSD, and the 4.xBSD series added many new features, including TCP/IP networking.

As time went on, code was later ported both from and to Unix System III and still later Unix System V. Unix System V Revision 4 (SVR4), released circa 1992, contained much code which was ported from BSD version up to and including 4.3BSD.

- Darwin
- DragonFly BSD
- FreeBSD
- iOS
- macOS (Mac OS X) (Note: Certified UNIX 03 brand.)
- NeXTSTEP
- OpenBSD
- OpenStep
- NetBSD
- SunOS
- TrueNAS Core

== Other Unix operating systems ==
Below are other certified Unix operating systems:

- z/OS: z/OS by IBM is listed as two different operating systems, z/OS and z/OS V2R1. Both are Unix 95.

== Unix-like operating systems ==
- AOS (IBM PC RT)
- Amoeba
- Android (Note: Based on Linux.)
- Coherent
- DEMOS
- DNIX
- Domain/OS
- DYNIX
- GNU Hurd
- Linux (Note: Two of the distros are certified UNIX brands, Inspur K-UX and EulerOS.)
- LynxOS
- Minix
- MNOS
- MOS
- QNX
- Redox
- RISC iX
- SOX
- SerenityOS
- Ultrix
- uNETix

== See also ==
- Research Unix
- POSIX
- Single UNIX Specification
- Unix-like
- Unix wars
