= System V Interface Definition =

Early UNIX operating system specification

The System V Interface Definition (SVID) is a standard that describes the AT&T UNIX System V behavior, including that of system calls, C libraries, available programs and devices. While it was not the first attempt at a standardizations document (the industry trade association /usr/group published a standard in 1984 based on System III with a few system call additions from BSD), it was an important effort in early standardization of UNIX in a period when UNIX variants were multiplying rapidly and portability was problematic at best. By 1986, AT&T required conformance with SVID issue 2 if vendors were to actually brand their products "System V R3". By the 1990s, however, its importance was largely eclipsed by POSIX and the Single UNIX Specification, which were based in part upon the SVID. Part of the reason for this was undoubtedly their vendor-independent approach (see Unix wars).

== Versions of SVID ==
- Version 1, based on System V Release 2, published Spring, 1985
- Version 2, based on System V Release 3, published 1986 (3 volumes)
- Version 3, based on System V Release 4, published 1989
- Version 4, updated for compliance with XPG4 and POSIX 1003.1-1990, published 1995

== See also ==
- Intel Binary Compatibility Standard
