= Ridge Computers =

American computer manufacturer

Ridge Computers, Inc.
- Industry: Computer hardware Computer software
- Founded: May 1980; 46 years ago in Santa Clara, California, USA
- Founders: Edward J. Basart; Dave Folger; Ron Kolb; Hugh Martin; John Sell; Neil C. Wilhelm
- Defunct: April 1990
- Fate: Dissolved
- Headquarters: Santa Clara, California; Sunnyvale, California, USA
- Products: Ridge workstations and minicomputers Ridge Operating System (ROS)
- Number of employees: 150

Ridge Computers, Inc., was an American computer manufacturer active from 1980 to 1990. The company began as a builder of deskside workstations and workgroup servers and progressed to superminicomputers. They claimed to have produced the first commercially available Reduced instruction set computer (RISC) systems.

== Company history ==
Ridge Computers was established in May 1980 in Santa Clara, California by six original founders, five of whom had come from Hewlett-Packard (HP), and one from Zilog.

The company was named for the Montebello Ridge, in the Santa Cruz Mountains near Cupertino, California, where two of the founders used to go cycling.

Ridge's first prototype was running by autumn 1981, and entered beta testing one and a half years later in early 1983. The system was presented at the Comdex show in autumn 1983. The earliest CPUs were bit slice processors built from "Fast" ("F" infix) type 7400-series integrated circuits and Programmable Array Logic (PAL) devices.

The Ridge CPU's qualification as a RISC design has been challenged due to its use of variable length instructions, multiple-cycle instruction decode, microcoded control store, and relatively rich instruction set, with over 100 instructions. Other sources reaffirm the Ridge's RISC bona fides.

Ridge faced competition not only from Digital Equipment Corporation's popular VAX-11, but also from other early RISC adopters Celerity Computing and Pyramid Technology, the latter of which began shipping systems in March 1984.

Although considered closer in configuration and capability to contemporary workstations, Ridge described their early systems as "personal mainframes". Their original target market was designers and engineers running scientific and technical applications, including computer-aided design, computer imaging and animation, and scientific research. A significant customer was Pacific Data Images, who switched from DEC VAXen to Ridge 32s, reporting a doubling of performance.

In the early 1980s, the French government was negotiating cooperative technology agreements between French and foreign companies. Also around this time, Jacques Stern, newly installed Director and CEO of Groupe Bull, became interested in adding RISC-based products to his company's offerings. Bull finalized an agreement to share technologies with both Convergent Technologies and Ridge Computers.

Around September 1985, Ridge named Robert J. Kunze, of Hambrecht & Quist Group and Hambrecht & Quist Venture Partners, to their Board of Directors.

In the mid-1980s Ridge began to experience financial difficulties. In early 1986 the company was refinanced, receiving US$1,000,000 out of a planned US$10,000,000 from Hambrecht & Quist, and Groupe Bull. Bob O. Evans, a general partner in Hambrecht & Quist, was appointed chief executive officer.

In mid-1986, Ridge launched an Academic discount program in the UK similar to a program they had already established in the US.

In 1987, Ridge and Apollo Computer entered into a joint marketing agreement that promoted a hybrid configuration of Apollo workstations networked to a Ridge supermini.

By the late 1980s Ridge realized that unless they implemented their architecture in Very Large Scale Integration (VLSI) semiconductor technology, it would become uncompetitive. While some experimental CPUs were produced using gate array technology from Fujitsu, no VLSI-based systems were shipped.

In early 1988, Ridge underwent a restructuring that saw a 45% reduction in personnel, Michael Preletz installed as CEO, and a new focus on commercial sales, while delivery of the new CPU for the 5100 model was further delayed. Ridge was dissolved in April 1990.

Reports of the number of systems sold by Ridge Computers vary from four hundred to six hundred units. Several hundred others were manufactured and sold under license by Bull. The total system count has been estimated to have been one thousand systems.

Although not a product of Ridge Computers, the Cerberus multiprocessor simulator used a processor model with an instruction set architecture derived from that of the Ridge 32's CPU.

== People ==
At their peak, Ridge employed about one hundred fifty people. The founders and some former employees are listed below:

=== Founders ===
- Edward J. Basart came from Hewlett Packard, where he worked on the HP 3000 system. At Ridge he was involved in software development, and was the vice-president software. Basart was one of three that left Ridge to establish Network Computing Devices (NCD).
- Dave Folger was the only original founder that came to Ridge from Zilog. He was initially involved in software development, and later became president and chief executive officer. Folger left the company in April 1986.
- Ron Kolb came from HP. He was involved in hardware development.
- Hugh Martin came from HP. At Ridge, he was involved in hardware development. From Ridge, Martin moved to Apple Computer (Apple), where he was involved with Project Aquarius.
- John Sell came from Hewlett Packard, where he had worked on the HP 3000 Series 40 and 44 models. He was involved in hardware development at Ridge. At the suggestion of Arthur Rock, Sell went from Ridge to Apple, where he led the team creating the PowerPC Macintosh architecture.
- Neil C. Wilhelm came to Ridge from HP. He left the company after just a few months.

=== Other staff ===
- Sally Ahnger worked on file systems and distributed systems at Ridge. From Ridge she went to Sun Microsystems.
- Judy Bruner served as Chief Financial Officer from December 1984 until April 1988. She had also come to Ridge from HP. From Ridge she went to 3Com.
- Bob Cook, an engineer and mechanical designer, was with Ridge from 1984 to 1989. He was the sole designer of the Ridge 32S enclosure.
- Dave Cornelius was Ridge's Senior Software Engineer from October 1982 to January 1988. He left Ridge to go to NCD.
- Dale Dell'Ario is a program manager, designer, and engineer who was at Ridge from March 1983 to February 1987.
- Aprelle Deuell was a staff accountant from March 1985 to August 1988.
- Mike Haden was a programmer working with the Green Hills compiler for Ridge. He later worked for Green Hills Software Inc. directly.
- Michael Harrigan was a product manager at Ridge. Harrigan was one of three that left Ridge to establish NCD.
- Mehdi Jazayeri was the project manager for programming languages at Ridge from March 1985 to April 1986. His work included developing optimizing compiler technology.
- Marjorie Kondo was hired as the company secretary, and later became the administrator of personnel and facilities management.
- Bruce K. Leisz was vice-president of manufacturing from April 1983 to February 1988.
- Christopher B. Paisley was Chief Financial Officer & Vice-president of Finance for three years.
- Chip Pessa was the Director of CPU development.
- Nicholas D'Arcy Roche was appointed president and chief operating officer in October 1986. Prior to this Roche had spent twenty-five years at IBM, then gone to Soft Switch.
- Marilyn Miller Roche worked on developing a telemarketing department for the company.
- Michael Schulman was an application engineer at Ridge from 1984 to 1987. Schulman next worked for SGI.
- Bill Shellooe was a vice-president of Marketing and Sales.
- Michael Splain came to Ridge from Vitesse Semiconductor, and was a member of the technical staff from February 1987 to February 1988. He was responsible for developing diagnostic tools for the single-chip Ridge CPU. From Ridge he went to Sun Microsystems.
- Harry Taxin was a vice-president of Marketing & Sales.

Also at Ridge in some capacity were Doug Klein, Dana Craig, and David Marlin Hanttula. Klein was one of three that left Ridge to establish NCD.

== Products ==
=== Ridge Operating System (ROS) ===
Early Ridge Computers systems ran the Ridge Operating System (ROS). ROS is a message-passing operating system (OS) with inexpensive processes and virtual memory. Its internal structure is significantly different from that of Unix. The ROS kernel and that of the related Groupe Bull SPS 9 OS were described as microkernels by the developers who worked on them. ROS is based on Stanford University's V-system, and Ridge's long-term goal was to provide a distributed system with full network transparency.

The basic operating system comprises a small kernel, originally only 8 KB in size, which handles memory management, interprocess communications, and interrupt handling, with other functions provided by a set of server processes. The User Monitor server process presented a Unix-compatible interface to user processes, and the Directory Manager and Volume Manager emulated the Unix file system. Collectively these services were called a Unix compatibility layer. ROS incorporated features from both Unix System V and BSD universes.

One assessment reported poor performance when running ROS in multiuser mode. A paper by Basart identified issues with how ROS handled programs written for a Unix environment, particularly how the OS handled Unix's process fork and kill. Suggested improvements included moving the file system into the kernel, and revising the message primitives used by ROS. Later even the founders saw ROS as a liability in the market.

By 1987 Ridge began to offer a standard version of Unix that had been ported to the Ridge architecture by Bull. This operating system, called RX/V on Ridge-branded systems, eventually supplanted ROS on most Ridge models.

=== Ridge 32 ===
The original Ridge 32 (or Ridge Thirty Two) system was announced by the third quarter of 1982. It shipped with Ridge's V1 CPU design, development name Waterfall. This processor was partitioned into separate integer, memory management, and floating point units, each with a set of their own registers. Implemented in bit-slice technology, the architecture supported instruction lengths of 16, 32, and 48 bits.

==== Ridge 32C ====
The updated Ridge 32C was released in 1984. It could support from one to four users.

==== Ridge 32S ====
The Ridge 32S was a single-user system released in 1984, slightly after the 32C. It received a revised V2 CPU board set.

==== Ridge 32/1x0, 32/3x0, 32/5x0 ====
In 1985, Ridge released the 32/1x0 and 32/3x0 lines, which included the 32/110, 32/130, 32/310, and 32/330 models. The Ridge 32/530 was released in 1986.

==== Ridge 32 Turbo RX ====
In mid- to late-1987, the Ridge 32 Turbo RX model replaced the 32/1x0 and 32/3x0 lines.

=== Server/RT ===
Ridge's Server/RT was released in March 1986. It was intended for hybrid networks where the Server/RT provided file and processing services to a group of IBM PC workstations.

=== Ridge 3200 ===
The Ridge 3200 series was announced in May 1986, with models that could support up to 64 users. The line included the Ridge 3200/90, and 3200/95. These systems used the Headwall CPU.

=== Ridge 5100 ===
The Ridge 5100 system was announced in September 1987, and was expected to ship in February 1988. The 5100 was to use a new VLSI-based CPU. Ridge called the 5100 their fourth generation RISC system. It was expected to support up to 128 users, and provide performance of 14 MIPS.

The CPU for the 5100 was developed under the name Project Sunrise, and was to be a VLSI CPU implemented in Fujitsu gate arrays. In March 1987, Ridge announced that it had obtained financing for Sunrise. Performance of the early chips were disappointing. In December 1987, Ridge also proposed several architectural modifications that included an increase in the number of registers, the extension of addressing to 64 bits, and fixed-length instructions. The Sunrise CPU never shipped.

== Groupe Bull ==
Its original agreement with Ridge, signed in April 1984, granted Bull a license to build and sell Ridge-based systems. These would be produced by Bull-SEMS, Groupe Bull's minicomputer division, at their factory in Echrollyes near Grenoble, France, and sold as the SPS 9 series. Under the terms of the agreement, Bull made a capital investment in Ridge, and received a seat on Ridge's board of directors.

In October 1984, Bull acquired 11% of Ridge. Sales of the SPS 9 started in December of the same year.

The first models included the SPS 9/40 and SPS 9/60 running ROS. Later models included the SPS 9/400, SPS 9/600, SPS 9/800, and 9/830.

Bull did an in-house port of a version of Unix SystemV with the BSD 4.2 extensions to the Ridge architecture. They called the resulting operating system SPIX, and began selling it on their SPS 9 systems. It was sold on Ridge-branded systems as RX/V.

By September 1987, Bull ownership of Ridge had risen to just under 20%. In early 1988, Bull's remaining SPS model was renamed the DPX 5000.

At the same time that Ridge was starting work on the Sunrise VLSI CPU, Bull's Research Department formed a group with Jean-Michel Pernot to develop a next-generation Ridge-compatible CPU called Aurore. The Aurore project was cancelled in March 1987, after Ridge announced that they had obtained financing for their Sunrise CPU. The porting effort that Bull faced to accommodate Ridge's proposed architectural changes in the Sunrise CPU, and concerns about the relationship between Ridge, Bull, and Ridge's compiler supplier resulted in Bull deciding to pivot away from the Ridge architecture.

== Software and applications ==
Some software packages and specialized applications either developed for or hosted on Ridge and Bull-SEMS SPS 9 computers are listed below:

- The CDA 5000 design automation system from Cericor Inc. was offered for the Ridge 32C and Ridge 32S in February 1985.
- Silicon Graphics' Geometry Engine was integrated with the Ridge 32 in a joint venture between SGI and Ridge late in 1984.
- An OEM marketing agreement enabled Ridge to offer a custom version of the Multiplex product from Network Innovations Corp., which allowed spreadsheet and database applications running on MS-DOS computers to access relational databases hosted on a Ridge 3200 running RX/V.
- In September 1984 it was announced that the Ansys structural analysis program from Swanson Analysis Systems, Inc. was available for the Ridge 32.
- More than one program for creating computer graphics was developed for various models of Ridge minicomputer. They included the proprietary animation system developed by Pacific Data Systems, and the light interreflection calculation system developed by F. Sillion.
- The Eiffel object-oriented programming language, released commercially in late 1986, was compatible with many computer systems running either AT&T System V or BSD Unix, including the Bull SPS 9.
- In late January 1986, Ecad, Inc. released a version of their Simon digital MOS circuit simulator that was compatible with an extensive list of computers running AT&T Unix, including Ridge's systems.
- The PODA graphical animation system for legged robots was hosted on a Ridge 32C.
- The EQ3/6 Geochemical Modelling Plan for the Nevada Nuclear Waste Storage Investigations Project, developed by the Lawrence Livermore National Laboratory, was moved from CDC 7600 and Cray-1 computers to two dedicated Ridge computers, primarily because the Ridge systems supported the full FORTRAN 77 specification.
- The Technology in Music and Related Arts (TIMARA) program at the Oberlin Conservatory of Music replaced their previous Xerox SIGMA9 mainframe with a Ridge 32C. Outfitted with Xerox DACs, two Analogic MP2735 ADCs, and a MIDI interface, the system was used to continue their research into electronic music, work that had earlier resulted in the TEMPO composer's programming language, and the IRMA Interactive Real-TIME Music Assembler.
- Both the Lisp and Mainsail programming languages were ported to the SPS 9.
