= Unix wars =

Struggles between vendors to set Unix standard

Unix genealogy tree

The Unix wars were a struggle between vendors to set a standard for the Unix operating system in the late 1980s and early 1990s.

== Origins ==
Both AT&T Corporation and University of California, Berkeley are important in the early history of Unix. Although AT&T's Bell Labs created Unix, by the 1980s, Berkeley's Computer Systems Research Group was the leading non-commercial Unix developer. In the mid-1980s, the three common versions of Unix were AT&T's System III, the basis of Microsoft's Xenix and the IBM-endorsed PC/IX, among others; AT&T's System V, which it sought to establish as the new Unix standard; and the Berkeley Software Distribution (BSD). All were derived from AT&T's Research Unix but had diverged considerably.

Further, each vendor's version of Unix was different to some degree. For example, by the late 1980s, database vendor Informix Corporation developed software for more than 100 different Unix systems, and therefore had altogether over 1,000 versions of their products, while rival Ingres supported more than 40 systems. At a mid-1980s Usenix conference, AT&T staff had buttons that read "System V: Consider it Standard" and a number of major vendors were promoting products based on System V. On the other hand, System V did not yet have TCP/IP networking built-in, while BSD 4.2 did; vendors of engineering workstations were nearly all using BSD, and posters reading "4.2 > V" were available.

Several European vendors formed the X/Open standards group in 1984 to promote compatible open systems, and they chose to base their system on Unix. X/Open caught AT&T's attention. To increase the uniformity of Unix, AT&T and leading BSD Unix vendor Sun Microsystems started work in 1987 on a unified system. (The feasibility of this had been demonstrated a few years earlier by the US Army Ballistic Research Laboratory's System V environment for BSD Unix.) This was released in 1988 as System V Release 4 (SVR4).

While this decision was applauded by customers and the trade press, certain other Unix licensees feared Sun would be unduly advantaged. They formed the Open Software Foundation (OSF) in 1988. The same year, AT&T and another group of licensees responded by forming Unix International (UI). Technical issues soon took a back seat to vicious and public commercial competition between the two "open" versions of Unix, with X/Open holding the middle ground.

A 1990 study of various Unix versions' reliability found that in each version, between a quarter and a third of operating system utilities could be made to crash by fuzzing; the researchers attributed this, in part, to the "race for features, power, and performance" resulting from BSD–System V rivalry, which left developers little time to worry about reliability. An industry analyst nonetheless said that despite OSF and UI's fierce rivalry, "Two Unixes are a lot better than 225 — which is what we have had until now".

== Standardization ==
POSIX offered potential neutrality for some, such as Apple Computer, in the Unix wars. The 1988 POSIX standard initially concentrated on the systems' C library functions beyond what was included in the forthcoming C standard; later it expanded to specify other aspects of the system environment. POSIX specified a "lowest common denominator" that could be met by both System V and BSD-based variants, as well as some non-Unix systems, with a reasonable amount of effort.

In March 1993, the major participants in UI and OSF formed the Common Open Software Environment (COSE) alliance, effectively marking the end of the most significant era of the Unix wars. In June, AT&T sold its Unix assets to Novell, and in October Novell transferred the Unix brand to X/Open.

In 1996, X/Open and the new OSF merged to form the Open Group. COSE work such as the Single UNIX Specification, the current standard for branded Unix, is now the responsibility of the Open Group, which also controls the current POSIX standards.

Since then, occasional bursts of Unix factionalism have broken out, such as the HP/SCO "3DA" alliance in 1995, and Project Monterey in 1998, a teaming of IBM, SCO, Sequent, and Intel which was followed by litigation (SCO v. IBM) between IBM and the new SCO, formerly Caldera.

== BSD and the rise of Linux ==
BSD worked to purge copyrighted AT&T code from their version between 1989 and 1994. During this time, various open-source BSD x86 derivatives took shape, starting with 386BSD, which was soon succeeded by FreeBSD and NetBSD. OpenBSD emerged in 1995 as a fork of NetBSD, and DragonFly BSD as a fork from FreeBSD in 2003. Mac OS X v10.5 is the first operating system with open source BSD code to be certified as fully Unix compliant. BSD systems can claim direct ancestry from Version 7 Unix. According to Open Source advocate Eric S. Raymond, BSD systems can be considered "genetic Unix", if not "trademark Unix".

During the UNIX System Laboratories, Inc. v. Berkeley Software Design, Inc. lawsuit (1992–94), the nearly-complete GNU operating system was made operational by combining it with Linux.

== See also ==
- Editor war

== Sources ==
- Unix Wars (Living Internet)
- The UNIX Wars (Bell Labs)
- The UNIX System – History and Timeline (The Open Group)
- Unix Standards (Eric S. Raymond, The Art of Unix Programming)
- Chapter 11. OSF and UNIX International (Peter H. Salus, The Daemon, the GNU and the Penguin)
