= USDL =

USDL may refer to:

- Unified Service Description Language
- United States Department of Labor
- Unix System Development Laboratory
