= COSIX =

- Developer: China National Computer Software & Technology Service Corporation (CS&S), Compaq
- OS family: Unix (Tru64)
- Initial release: 1989; 37 years ago

COSIX is a Chinese UNIX operating system developed since 1989 by China National Computer Software & Technology Service Corporation (CS&S). A jointly developed 64-bit version with Compaq was released in 1999.

An early version of the COSIX kernel was developed based on UNIX System V, and the 64-bit version was based on Tru64 UNIX. A Linux distribution named COSIX Linux was developed by CS&S and released in 1999, which had no technical relationship to COSIX.

== See also ==
- SOX Unix
