= PC-UX =

- Developer: NEC
- OS family: Unix
- Working state: Discontinued
- Platforms: APC III, PC-9801

PC-UX was a discontinued NEC port of UNIX System III for their APC III and PC-9801 personal computer. PC-UX possessed extensive graphics capabilities at the time of its release. PC-UX and MS-DOS could reside on the same hard drive, with PC-UX containing transfer utilities that allowed for file transfers to MS-DOS.

In 1985, the suggested retail price for PC-UX on APC III was $700.

NEC's subsequent port of UNIX System V was called PC-UX/V.

== See also ==
- Xenix for AT etc.
