= UXP/DS =

- Developer: Fujitsu
- OS family: Unix System V
- Working state: Discontinued
- Source model: Closed source
- Initial release: 1991; 34 years ago
- Marketing target: Workstation, Network Server
- Platforms: SPARC
- Kernel type: Monolithic kernel
- License: Proprietary

UXP/DS is a discontinued Unix operating system developed by Fujitsu for its line of workstations and network servers. UXP/DS is based on AT&T System V Release 4 (SVR4), and targets Fujitsu's DS/90 7000 series of computers, as well as some GP7000 series computers.

== History ==
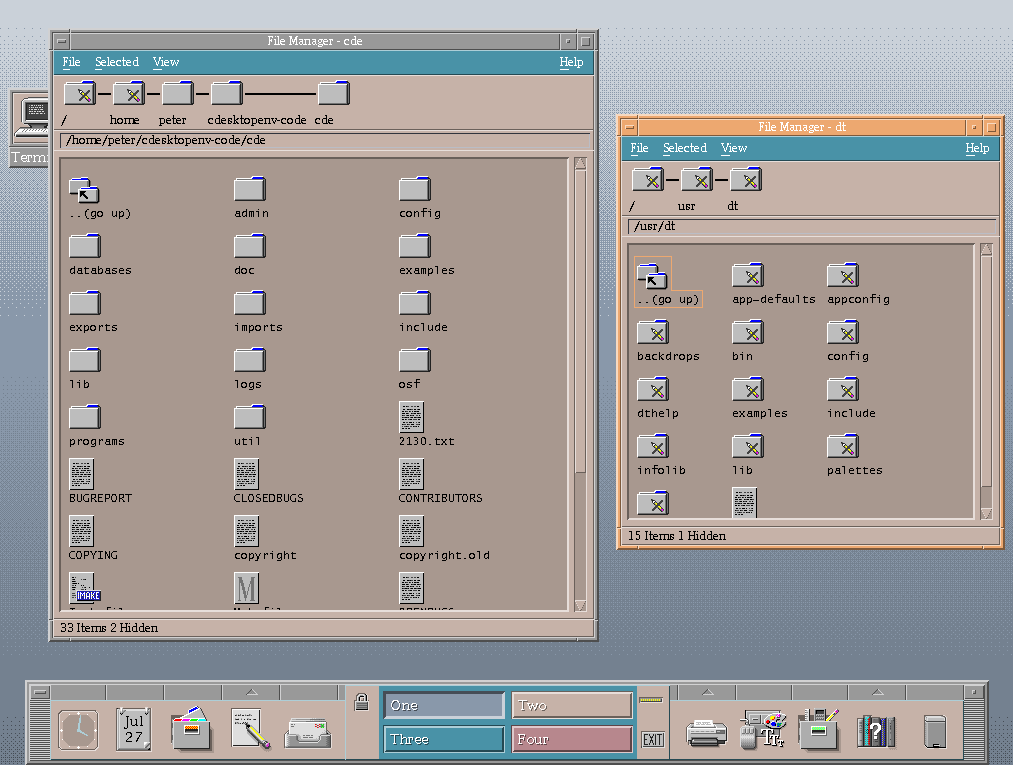
UXP/DS was a reference platform for the Common Desktop Environment (pictured here running on Linux).

In 1991, Fujitsu announced the DS/90 7000 series of workstations and servers, powered by SPARC processors, and running the UXP/DS operating system.

In 1998, Fujitsu's new GP7000 series (GRANPOWER 7000) was divided into three parts. Series "S" represented their previous systems running UXP/DS. Series "D" represented their new systems also running UXP/DS. Series "F" represented their new systems running Solaris operating system. GP7000F running Solaris became the basis for later lines of Fujitsu Unix servers.

In 1999, UXP/DS on the DS/90 7000 series was one of the reference platforms for the Common Desktop Environment (CDE).

In 2000, when Fujitsu released its new PRIMEPOWER line of Unix servers, only Solaris was available as an option for the operating system.

== See also ==
- EWS-UX
- Sony NEWS
- Fujitsu VP2000 optional running UXP/M for Mainframes as Vector and Parallel Processors
