= UNETix =

Early implementation of UNIX

uNETix
- Developer: Lantech Systems
- OS family: Unix-like
- Working state: Discontinued
- Platforms: x86
- License: Proprietary

uNETix is an early implementation of UNIX for IBM PC systems. It was not a "true" UNIX, but was written from scratch for the PC without using any code from System V.

== Overview ==
uNETix only supported a single user. However, it maintained closer compatibility with standard versions of UNIX than early versions of QNX. uNETix' multiple windows capability was possibly the first implementation of windowing in a Unix-like operating system. Up to 10 windows were supported, which could each run independent tasks and could have individual foreground and background colors set with a special color command.

Published by Lantech Systems, Inc, uNETix had a list price in 1984 of US$130, but was discounted and advertised at US$99 (300 USD today). The minimum RAM requirement was 256 KB, but a 256 KB machine would only be able to support single-tasking; multitasking required 512 KB. It had an emulation environment for MS-DOS that could run DOS 1.1 programs in one window while UNIX programs ran in other windows. Its major weaknesses were slow speed and lack of hard disk support. uNETix came with a full assembly language programming environment, and a C compiler was optional. Lantech claimed that the C compiler was the first available for the x86 architecture.

== See also ==
- Xenix
- UNIX System V
- AT&T UNIX PC
