= SOX (operating system) =

Brazilian UNIX clone

- Developer: Computadores e Sistemas Brasileiros S/A
- OS family: Unix-like
- Working state: Discontinued
- Platforms: COBRA minicomputers
- License: Proprietary

SOX is a discontinued UNIX clone. It was developed from scratch in Brazil, in the late 1980s, by Computadores e Sistemas Brasileiros S/A (now Cobra Tecnologia), under the leadership of Ivan da Costa Marques. Certified as UNIX-compatible by X/Open (through UniSoft) in early 1989, SOX was one of the first re-implementations of UNIX, fully independent of AT&T, that passed the X/Open verification tests, and the only one ever completed entirely outside the United States.

SOX was designed to run on COBRA's own minicomputers and was the result of the Brazilian Informatics Policy, which aimed to achieve technological independence from the United States. Despite being a technical success, SOX came too late, when COBRA had largely lost its support. SOX development stopped soon after it was certified, when the government decided to allow use of UNIX System V Release 4.0.

== See also ==
- COSIX
- History of Unix
- SISNE plus
