= SINIX =

SINIX / Reliant UNIX
- Developer: Siemens Nixdorf Informationssysteme, Fujitsu Siemens Computers
- OS family: UNIX System V
- Working state: Discontinued
- Source model: Closed source
- Initial release: 1984; 42 years ago
- Latest release: 5.43 (SINIX), 5.45 (Reliant UNIX) / 1995 (SINIX)
- Supported platforms: NSC-32x32, Intel 80186, Intel 80386, Intel 80486, MIPS
- Kernel type: Monolithic kernel
- Userland: SUS
- License: Proprietary
- Official website: SINIX at sni.de at the Wayback Machine (archived 2000-06-11)

SINIX is a discontinued variant of the Unix operating system from Siemens Nixdorf Informationssysteme. SINIX supersedes SIRM OS and Pyramid Technology's DC/OSx. Following X/Open's acceptance that its requirements for the use of the UNIX trademark were met, version 5.44 and subsequent releases were published as Reliant UNIX by Fujitsu Siemens Computers.

== Features ==
In some versions of SINIX (5.2x) the user could emulate the behaviour of a number of different versions of Unix (known as universes). These included System V.3, System III or BSD. Each universe had its own command set, libraries and header files.

== Xenix-based SINIX ==
The original SINIX was a modified version of Xenix and ran on Intel 80186 processors. For some years Siemens used the NSC-32x32 (up to Sinix 5.2x) and Intel 80486 CPUs (Sinix 5.4x - non MIPS) in their MX-Series.

== System V-based SINIX ==
Later versions of SINIX based on System V were designed for the:

- SNI RM-200, RM-300, RM-400 and RM-600 servers running on the MIPS processor (SINIX-N, SINIX-O, SINIX-P, SINIX-Y)
- SNI PC-MX2, MX300-05/-10/-15/-30, Siemens MX500-75/-85 running NS320xx (SINIX-H)
- PC-MXi, MX300-45 on the Intel X86 processor (SINIX-L)
- SNI WX-200 and other IBM-compatible i386 PCs on the Intel 80386 and newer processors (SINIX-Z)

The last release under the SINIX name was version 5.43 in 1995.

== Reliant UNIX ==
The last Reliant UNIX versions were registered as UNIX 95 compliant (XPG4 hard branding).

The last release of Reliant UNIX was version 5.45.

== See also ==
- BS2000
- VM2000
