= Unix/NS =

- Developer: NCR
- OS family: Unix
- Source model: Closed source
- Kernel type: Monolithic kernel
- License: Proprietary

Unix/NS (the NCR 3700 Operating System) is based on the Unix SVR4. It contains significant extensions for massively parallel systems, in particular Distributed Memory DBMSs. The extensions include the concepts of virtual processor and virtual disk, message and global synchronization system, segment system, and globally distributed objects. When compared to other parallel UNIX operating systems like Mach or Chorus, Unix/NS has a more powerful communication and message addressing paradigm, and richer process-group management and global synchronization mechanism.
