= Intel Binary Compatibility Standard =

Application binary interface for Intel microprocessors

The Intel Binary Compatibility Standard (iBCS) is a standardized application binary interface (ABI) for Unix operating systems on Intel-386-compatible computers, published by AT&T, Intel and SCO in 1988, and updated in 1990. It extends source-level standards such as POSIX and XPG3 by standardizing various operating system interfaces, including the filesystem hierarchy layout (i.e., the locations of system files and installed programs), so that Unix programs would run on the various vendor-specific Unix implementations for Intel hardware (such as Xenix, SCO Unix and System V implementations). The second edition, announced in 1990, added an interface specification for VGA graphics.

iBCS, edition 2, was supported by various Unix versions, such as UnixWare and third-party implementations. A Linux implementation was developed ca. 1994, enabling Linux to run commercial Unix applications such as WordPerfect.

There have been several security issues in various iBCS implementations over the years.

== See also ==
- Filesystem Hierarchy Standard (FHS)
- Linux Standard Base (LSB)
- x86 calling conventions
