= DYNIX =

- Developer: Sequent Computer Systems
- OS family: Unix-like (BSD or SysV)
- Working state: Discontinued
- Initial release: 1984; 42 years ago
- Available in: English
- Supported platforms: x86
- Succeeded by: DYNIX/ptx

DYNIX (DYNamic UnIX) was a Unix-like operating system developed by Sequent Computer Systems, based on 4.2BSD and modified to run on Intel-based symmetric multiprocessor hardware. The third major (Dynix 3.0) version was released May, 1987; by 1992 DYNIX was succeeded by DYNIX/ptx, which was based on UNIX System V.

IBM obtained rights to DYNIX/ptx in 1999, when it acquired Sequent for $810 million.

IBM's subsequent Project Monterey was an attempt, circa 1999, "to unify AIX with Sequent's Dynix/ptx operating system and UnixWare." By 2001, however, "the explosion in popularity of Linux ... prompted IBM to quietly ditch" this.
