= CB UNIX =

Unix variant developed by the Columbus, Ohio branch of Bell Labs

Columbus UNIX / CB UNIX
- Developer: Bell Labs
- Written in: C
- OS family: Unix
- Working state: Discontinued
- Available in: English
- Default user interface: Command-line interface

Columbus UNIX, or CB UNIX, is a discontinued variant of the UNIX operating system used internally at Bell Labs for administrative databases and transaction processing. It was developed at the Columbus, Ohio branch, based on V6, V7 and PWB Unix. It was little-known outside the company.

CB UNIX was developed to address deficiencies inherent in Research Unix, notably the lack of interprocess communication (IPC) and file locking, considered essential for a database management system. Several Bell System operation support system products were based on CB UNIX such as Switching Control Center System. The primary innovations were power-fail restart, line disciplines, terminal types, and IPC features.

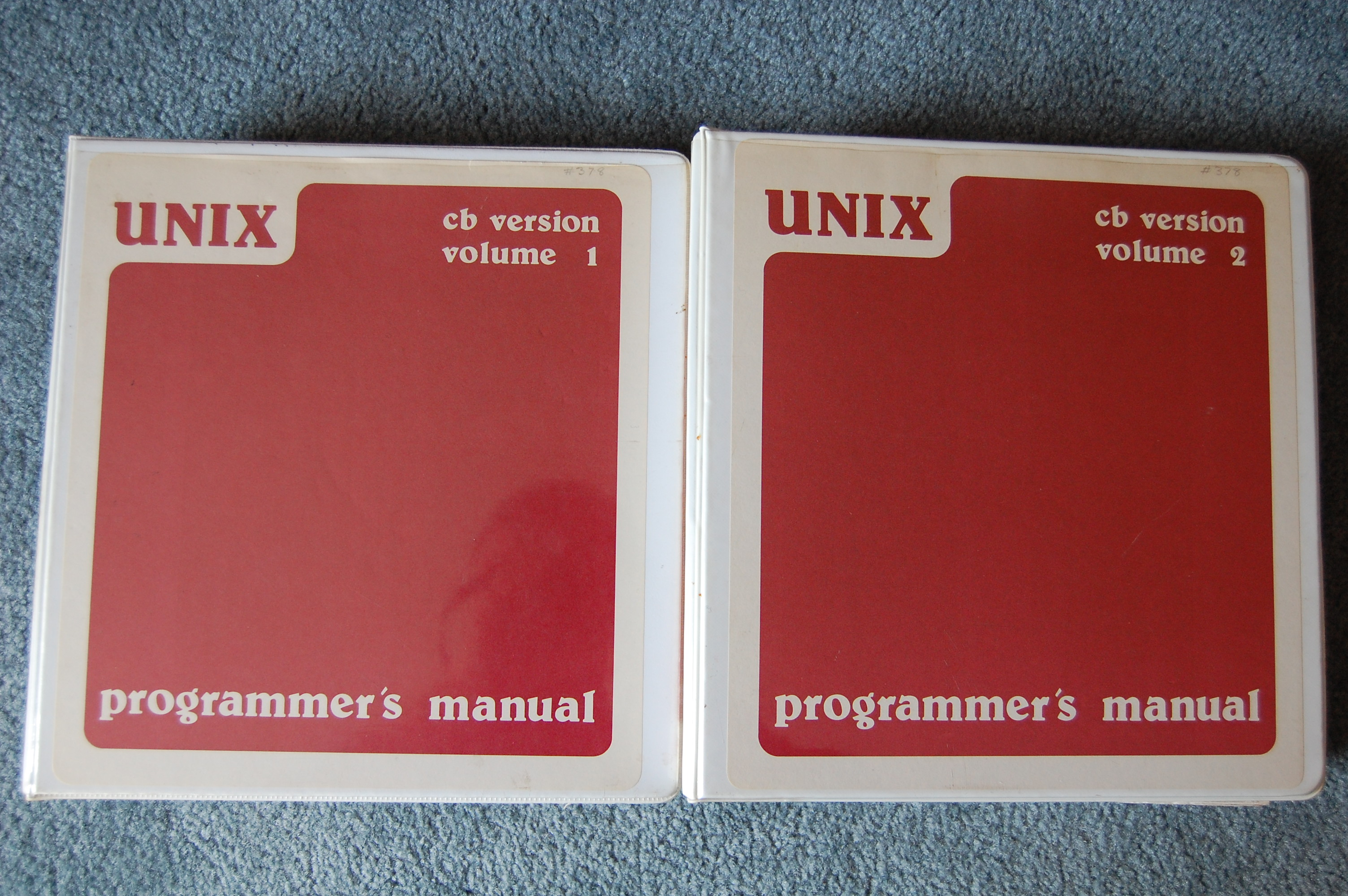
Volumes 1 and 2 of the UNIX Programmer's Manual, CB Version

The interprocess communication features developed for CB UNIX were message queues, semaphores and shared memory support. These eventually appeared in mainstream Unix systems starting with System V in 1983, and are now collectively known as System V IPC.
