= DC/OSx =

- Developer: Pyramid Technology
- OS family: Unix System V
- Working state: Historical
- Source model: Closed source
- Initial release: 1989
- Marketing target: Network Server
- Supported platforms: MIPS architecture
- Kernel type: Monolithic kernel
- License: Proprietary

DC/OSx (DataCenter/OSx) is a discontinued Unix operating system for MIPS based systems developed by Pyramid Technology in 1989. It ran on its Nile series of SMP machines and was a port of AT&T System V Release 4 (SVR4). In 1995, Pyramid Technology was acquired by Siemens Nixdorf Informationssysteme (SNI), and DC/OSx was superseded by the SINIX operating system.

== History ==
DC/OSx was the first symmetric multiprocessing (SMP) implementation on Unix System V Release 4.

DC/OSx was later superseded by SINIX, a version of the Unix operating system from SNI. Features of DC/OSx were incorporated into SINIX; later versions were branded as Reliant Unix.

== See also ==
- BS2000
- Timeline of operating systems
