= Interactive Systems Corporation =

American software company

Interactive Systems Corporation (ISC)
- Industry: Computer software
- Founded: 1977; 49 years ago
- Founder: Peter G. Weiner
- Fate: Acquired by the Eastman Kodak Company in 1988
- Headquarters: Santa Monica, California, United States
- Products: IS/1, IS/3, IS/5, PC/IX, 386/ix, INTERACTIVE UNIX System V/386

Interactive Systems Corporation (styled INTERACTIVE Systems Corporation, abbreviated ISC) was a US-based software company and the first vendor of the Unix operating system outside AT&T, operating from Santa Monica, California. It was founded in 1977 by Peter G. Weiner, a RAND Corporation researcher who had previously founded the Yale University computer science department and had been the Ph.D. advisor to Brian Kernighan, one of Unix's developers at AT&T. Weiner was joined by Heinz Lycklama, also a veteran of AT&T and previously the author of a Version 6 Unix port to the LSI-11 computer.

ISC was acquired by the Eastman Kodak Company in 1988, which maintained the company as a wholly owned subsidiary operating under Kodak's Commercial Imaging Group. ISC expanded under Kodak's ownership, acquiring networking software developer Lachman Associates in 1989 and the VP/ix "DOS-under-UNIX" software from Phoenix Technologies in 1991. Kodak later sold its ISC Unix operating system assets to Sun Microsystems on September 26, 1991. Kodak sold the remaining parts of ISC to SHL Systemhouse Inc in 1993.

Several former ISC staff founded Segue Software which partnered with Lotus Development to develop the Unix version of Lotus 1-2-3 and with Peter Norton Computing to develop the Unix version of the Norton Utilities.

== Products ==
ISC's 1977 offering, IS/1, was a Version 6 Unix variant enhanced for office automation running on the PDP-11. IS/3 and IS/5 were enhanced versions of Unix System III and System V for PDP-11 and VAX. ISC Unix ports to the IBM PC included a variant of System III, developed under contract to IBM, known as PC/IX (Personal Computer Interactive eXecutive, also abbreviated PC-IX), with later versions branded 386/ix and finally INTERACTIVE UNIX System V/386 (based on System V Release 3.2). ISC was AT&T's "Principal Publisher" for System V.4 on the Intel platform. ISC was also involved in the development of VM/IX (Unix as a guest OS in VM/370) and enhancements to IX/370 (a TSS/370-based Unix system that IBM originally developed jointly with AT&T ca. 1980). They also developed the AIX 1.0 (Advanced Interactive eXecutive) for the IBM RT PC, again under contract to IBM, although IBM awarded the development contract for AIX version 2 of AIX/386 and AIX/370 to the competing Locus Computing Corporation.

=== PC/IX ===
PC/IX for the IBM PC running in a virtual machine

Although observers in the early 1980s expected that IBM would choose Microsoft Xenix or a version from AT&T Corporation as the Unix for its microcomputer, PC/IX was the first Unix implementation for the IBM PC XT available directly from IBM. According to Bob Blake, the PC/IX product manager for IBM, their "primary objective was to make a credible Unix system - [...] not try to 'IBM-ize' the product. PC-IX is System III Unix." PC/IX was not, however, the first Unix port to the XT: Venix/86 preceded PC/IX by about a year, although it was based on the older Version 7 Unix.

The main addition to PC/IX was the INed screen editor from ISC. INed offered multiple windows and context-sensitive help, paragraph justification and margin changes, although it was not a fully fledged word processor. PC/IX omitted the System III FORTRAN compiler and the tar file archiver, and did not add BSD tools like vi or the C shell. One reason for not porting these was that in PC/IX, individual applications were limited to a single segment of 64 kB of RAM.

To achieve good filesystem performance, PC/IX addressed the XT hard drive directly, rather than doing this through the BIOS, which gave it a significant speed advantage compared to MS-DOS. (Note: This also makes it incompatible with most modern virtualization software, except dedicated emulators that fully emulate the XT hard drive controller.) Because of the lack of true memory protection in the 8086 and 8088 chips, IBM only sold single-user licenses for PC/IX.

The PC/IX distribution came on 19 floppy disks and was accompanied by a 1,800-page manual. Installed, PC/IX took approximately 4.5 MB of disk space. An editorial by Bill Machrone in PC Magazine at the time of PC/IX's launch flagged the $900 price as a show stopper given its lack of compatibility with MS-DOS applications. PC/IX was not a commercial success although BYTE in August 1984 described it as "a complete, usable single-user implementation that does what can be done with the 8088", noting that PC/IX on the PC outperformed Venix on the PDP-11/23.

=== INTERACTIVE UNIX System ===
INTERACTIVE UNIX with Looking Glass interface under QEMU

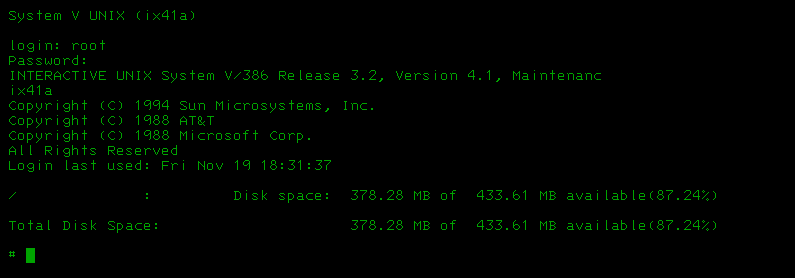
INTERACTIVE UNIX 4.1a connected remotely via the wx3270 terminal emulator.

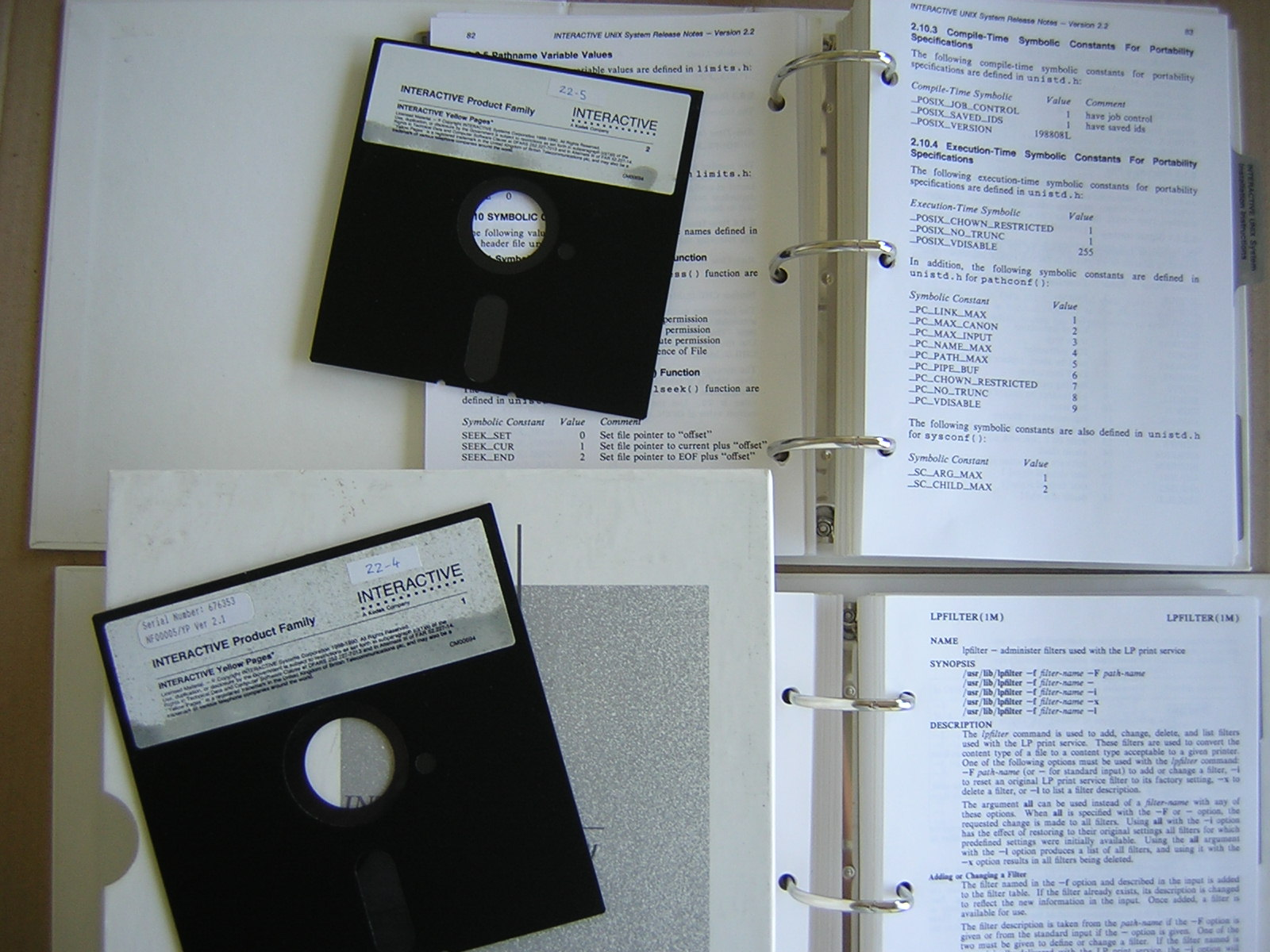
Interactive Unix manual

PC/IX was succeeded by 386/ix in 1985, a System VR3 derivative. Later versions were termed INTERACTIVE UNIX System V/386 and based on System V 3.2, though with elements of BSD added.

After its acquisition of Interactive, Sun Microsystems continued to maintain INTERACTIVE UNIX System, offering it as a low-end alternative to its System V.4-based Solaris, even when the latter had been ported to x86-based desktop machines. This version of the INTERACTIVE UNIX System was praised by a PC Magazine reviewer for its stability. The last version was "System V/386 Release 3.2 Version 4.1.1", released in July 1998. Official support ended on July 23, 2006, five years after Sun withdrew the product from sale.

Until version ISA 3.0.1, INTERACTIVE UNIX System supported only 16 MB of RAM. In the next versions, it supported 256 MB RAM and the PCI bus. EISA versions always supported 256 MB RAM.

== See also ==
- Coherent (operating system)
