= UNIX System III =

Discontinued UNIX variant

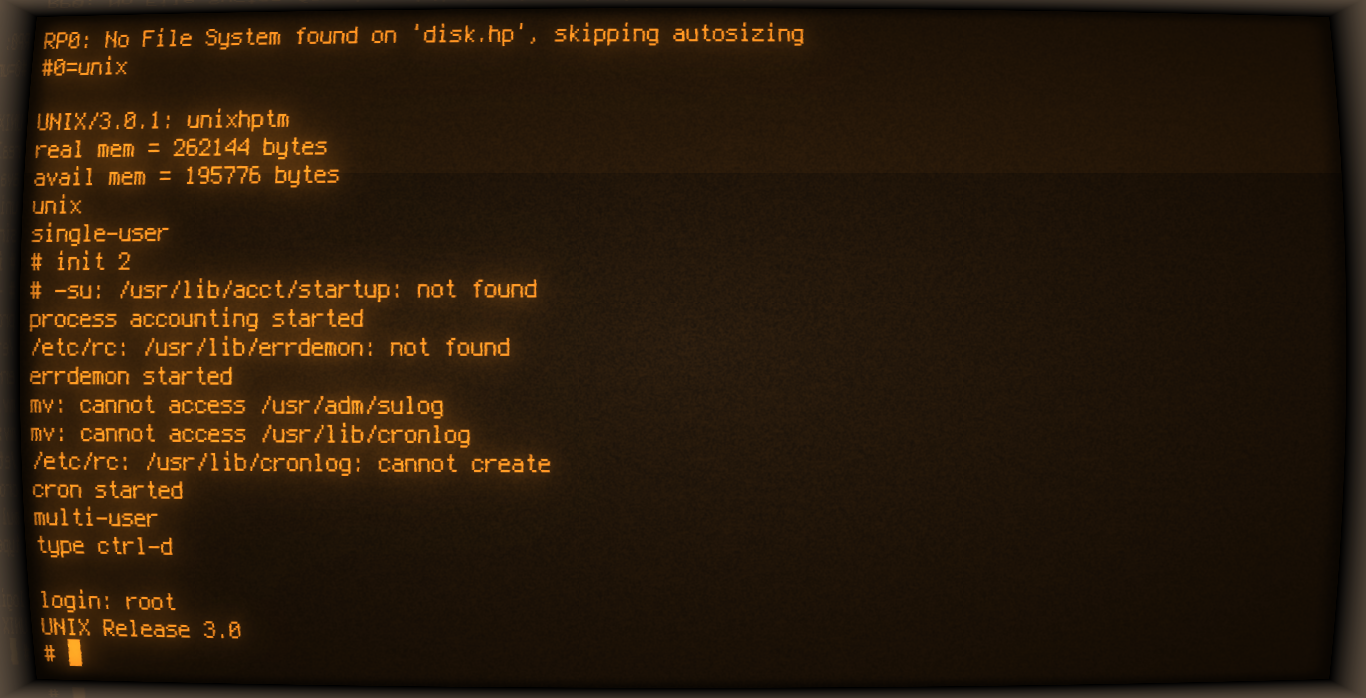
- UNIX System III on SIMH (PDP-11)
- Developer: AT&T's Unix Support Group (USG)
- Written in: C
- OS family: Unix
- Working state: Discontinued
- Source model: Closed source
- Initial release: 1980; 46 years ago
- Available in: English
- Supported platforms: DEC PDP-11 and VAX
- Default user interface: Command-line interface
- Succeeded by: UNIX System V

UNIX System III (or System 3) is a discontinued version of the Unix operating system released by AT&T's Unix Support Group (USG).

AT&T announced System III in late 1981, and it was first released outside of Bell Labs in 1982. UNIX System III was a mix of various AT&T Unix systems: Version 7 Unix, PWB/UNIX 2.0, CB UNIX 3.0, UNIX/RT and UNIX/32V. System III supported the DEC PDP-11 and VAX computers.

The system was apparently called System III because it was considered the outside release of UNIX/TS 3.0.1 and CB UNIX 3 which were internally supported Bell Labs Unices; its manual refers to it as UNIX Release 3.0 and there were no Unix versions called System I or System II. There was no official release of UNIX/TS 4.0 (which would have been System IV) either, so System III was succeeded by System V, based on UNIX/TS 5.0.

System III introduced new features such as named pipes, the uname system call and command, and the run queue. It also combined various improvements to Version 7 Unix by outside organizations. However, it did not include notable additions made in BSD such as the C shell (csh) and screen editing.

Third-party variants of System III include (early versions of) HP-UX, IRIX, IS/3 and PC/IX, PC-UX, PNX, SINIX, Venix and Xenix.
