= Sony NEWS =

UNIX workstation series

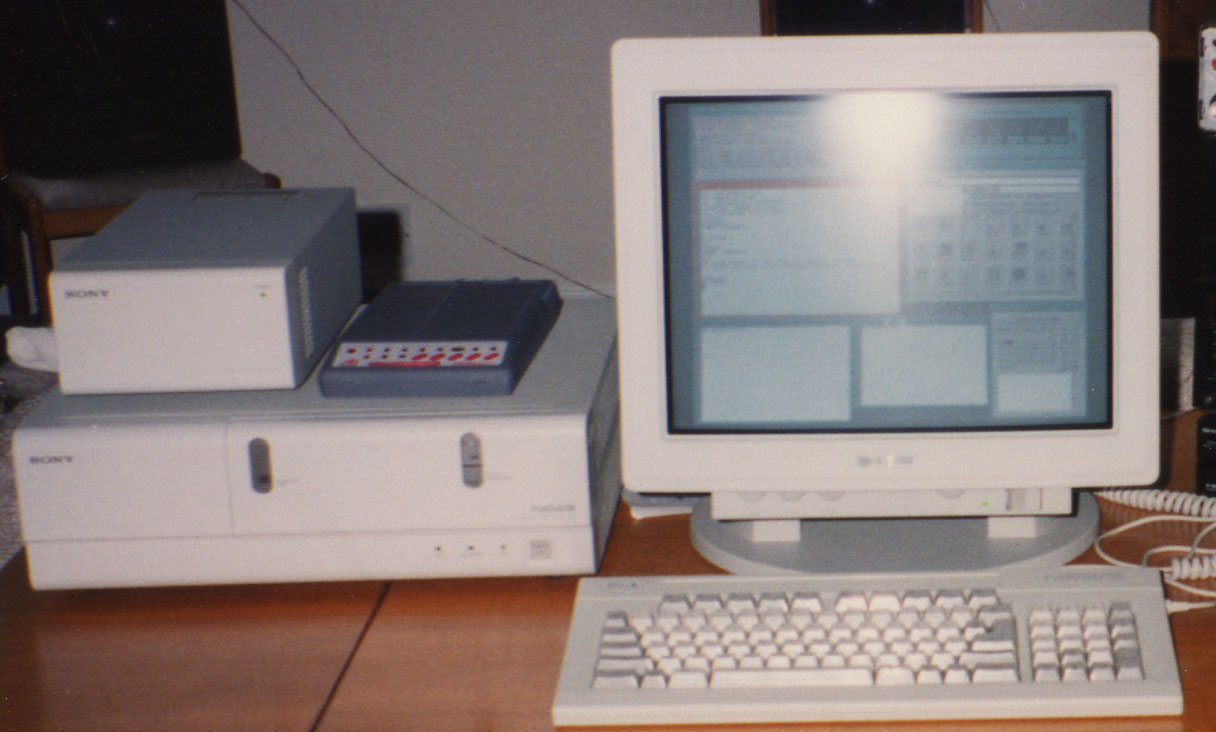
- Sony NEWS workstation: 2x 68030 @ 25 MHz, 1280x1024 256-color display
- Manufacturer: Sony
- Type: Computer hardware
- Released: January 1987
- Discontinued: 1998
- Operating system: NEWS-OS
- CPU: 680x0 and MIPS
- Website: www.sony.co.jp/SonyInfo/CorporateInfo/History/SonyHistory/2-12.html

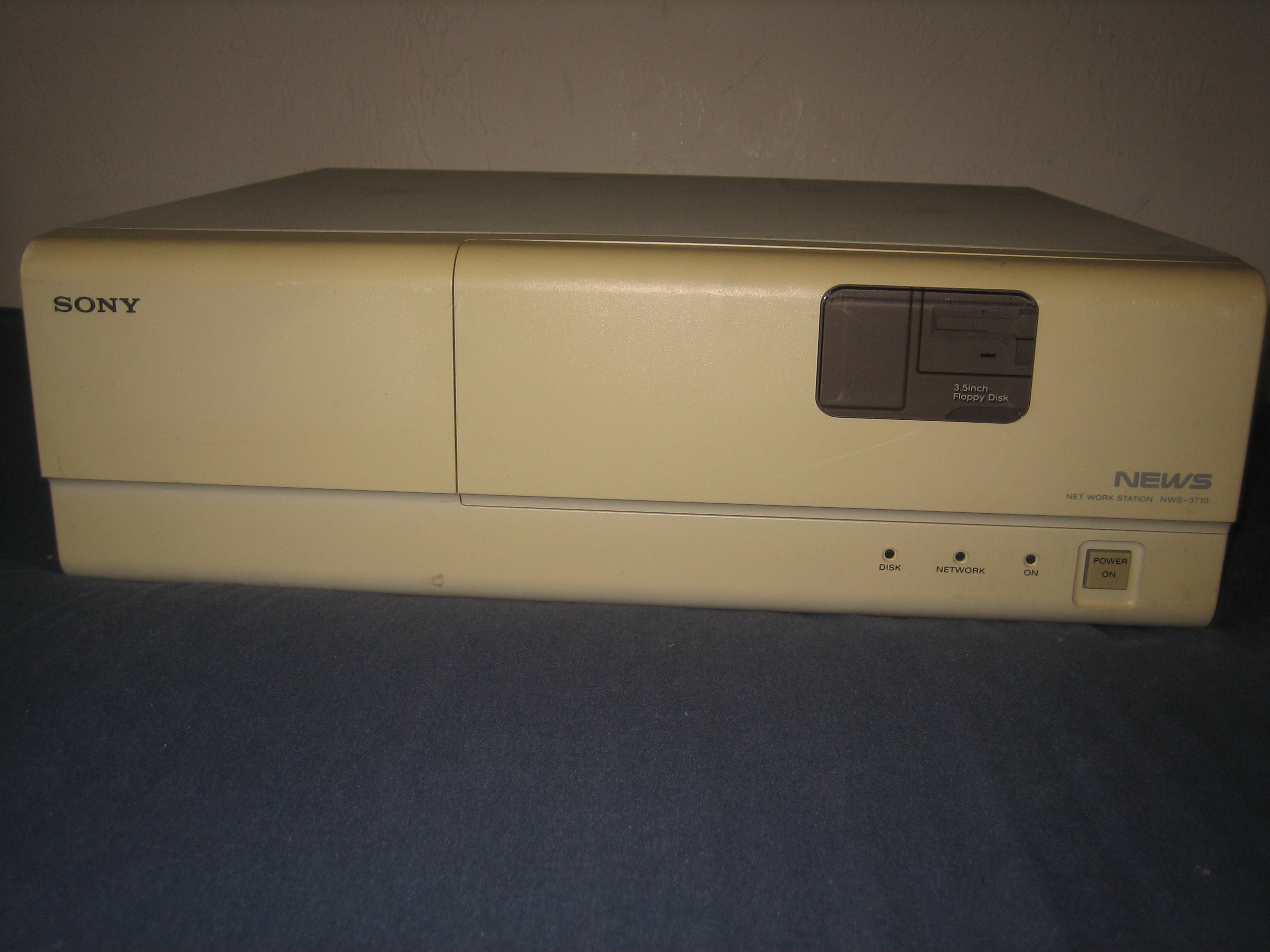
Sony NWS-3710 front

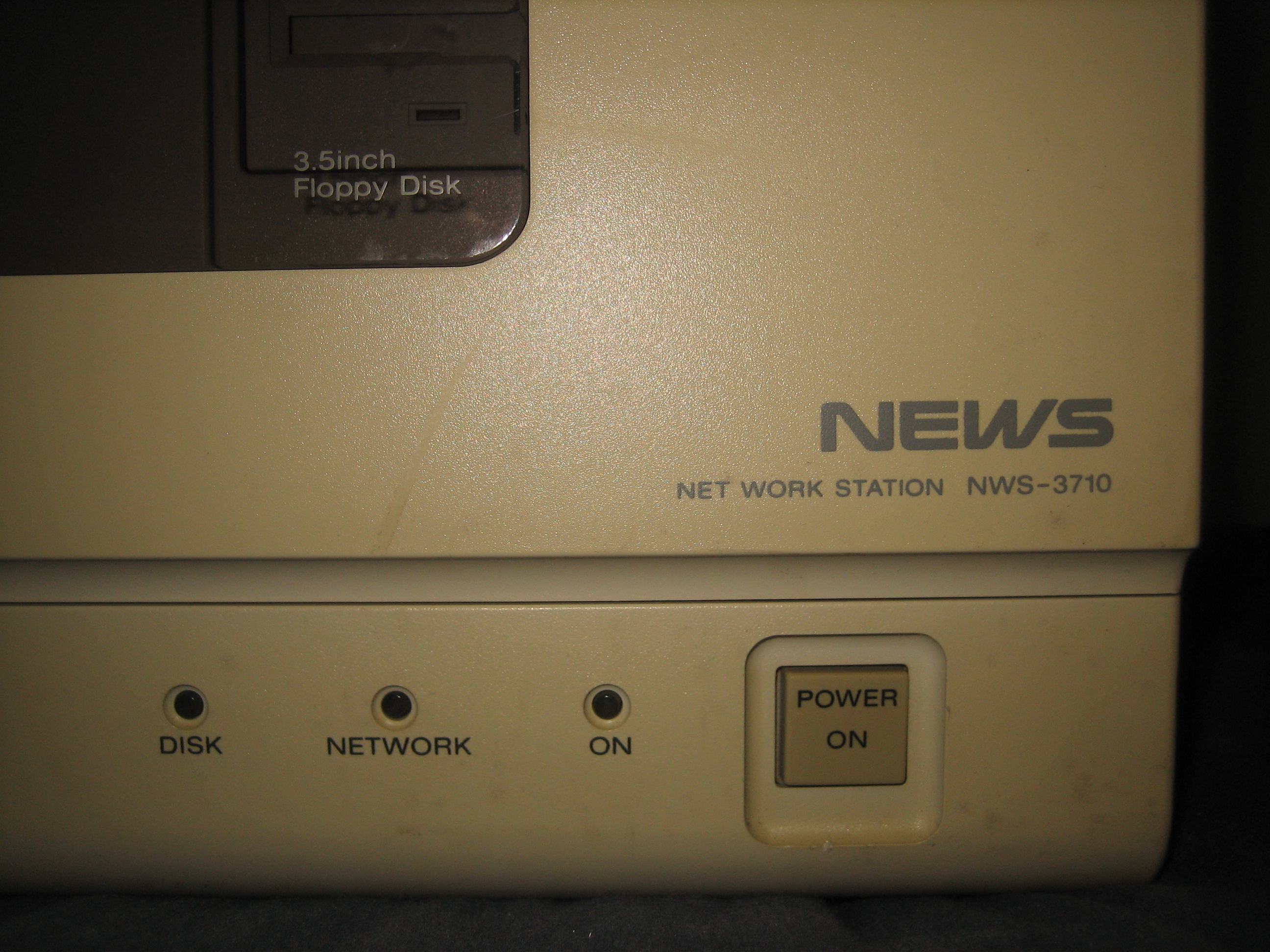
Sony NWS-3710 front detail

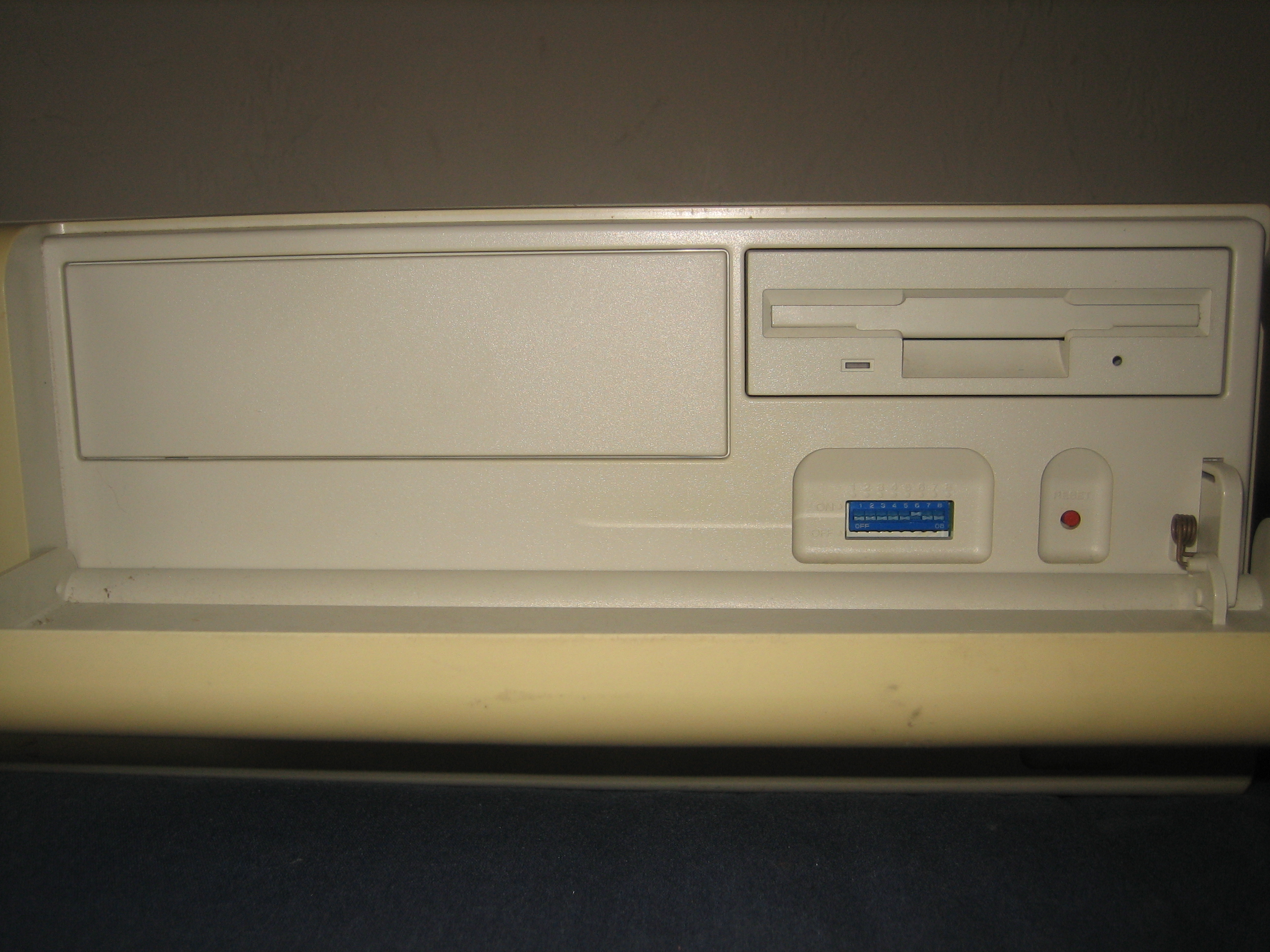
Sony NWS-3710 with front door open

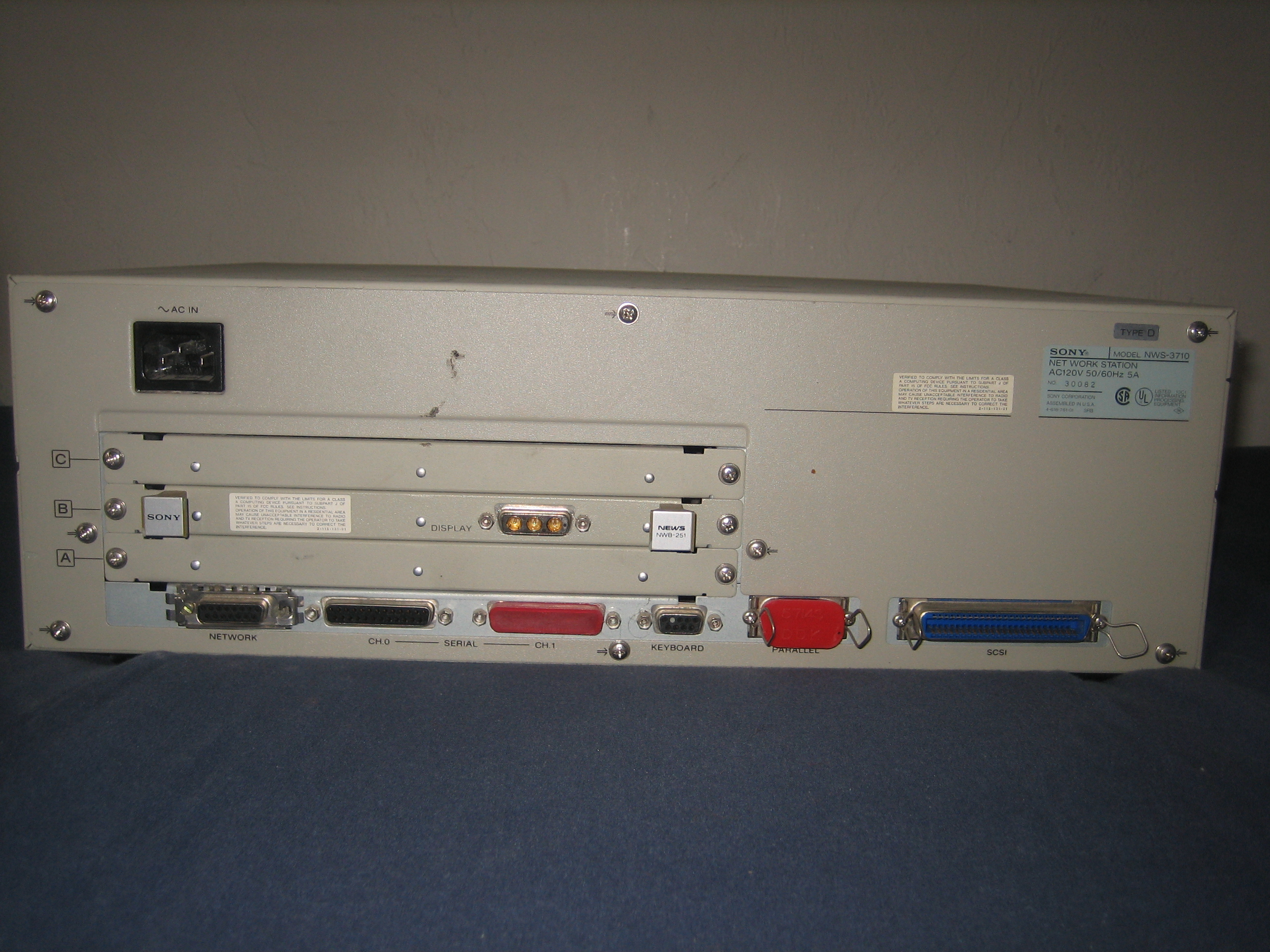
Rear view of the Sony NWS-3710

The Sony NEWS ("Network Engineering Workstation", later "NetWorkStation") is a series of Unix workstations sold during the late 1980s and 1990s. The first NEWS machine was the NWS-800, which originally appeared in Japan in January 1987 and was conceived as a desktop replacement for the VAX series of minicomputers.

== History ==
=== 1980s ===
Sony's NEWS project leader, Toshitada Doi, originally wanted to develop a computer for business applications, but his engineers wanted to develop a replacement for minicomputers running Unix that they preferred to use:

In the beginning, Doi's concept of the workstation was a device, which was essentially an extension of current [MIPS (Media Information Products and System) Business Group] projects. He saw it as consisting of "a 32-bit CPU developed in a short time with unrestricted applications." Basically, he thought of it as an OA computer. However, the engineers Doi selected for his team did not listen to what Doi told them to do. They wanted to develop a workstation that could replace the VAX Super Mini Computer developed by Digital Equipment Corp. (DEC). This was a computer that the engineers often fought with each other to use while at MIPS because of the limited number. They wanted to develop something they themselves could use for their own day to day work.

Initial development of the NEWS was completed in 1986 after only one year of development. It launched at a lower price than competitors (US$5,600–16,300), and it outperformed conventional minicomputers. After a successful launch, the line expanded and the new focus for the NEWS became desktop publishing and CAD/CAM.

In 1989, three workstations based on Motorola 68030 were introduced: NWS-1750 (with a single CPU), NWS-1830 and NWS-1850 (with 2 CPUs). The computers were equipped in optical disk drive using erasable cartridges allowing to store 594 MB of data.

=== 1990s ===
In 1991, Sony broadened the NEWS range with the 3250 portable workstation, reportedly described in product literature as a laptop but weighing 18 pounds and having more in common with portable computers, being "designed to be set up on a desk and plugged in". Featuring an 11-inch monochrome liquid crystal display with a resolution of 1120 x 780 and keyboard with "75 full travel keys", the machine was fitted with an internal hard drive and a 3.5-inch floppy drive. A SCSI port permitted the addition of other storage devices, and Ethernet, parallel and serial ports were provided, along with a mouse port and audio in/out ports for audio processing. In terms of its fundamental computing facilities, the system employed a 20 MHz MIPS R3000 CPU with R3010 floating-point coprocessor, offered 8 MB of RAM expandable to 36 MB, running an implementation of Unix System V Release 4 and providing an Open Software Foundation Motif graphical environment. In the United States, a configuration with 240 MB hard drive cost $9,900, with the 406 MB configuration costing $11,900.

Early PlayStation development kits were based on Sony NEWS hardware, with added PlayStation hardware. Nintendo also developed its first-party Super NES titles on Sony NEWS hardware.

The Sony NEWS was unable to break into the U.S. market, where Sun Microsystems was dominant, and also did not fare well in Europe.

The NEWS platform was later used for video-on-demand applications, and for Internet server applications.

The NEWS division at Sony was dissolved in 1998.

== Hardware ==
The Sony NEWS originally came equipped with a dual 680x0 (68020 or 68030) processor configuration running at 16-25 MHz. Later, the Sony NEWS was moved to the MIPS architecture, with MIPS III and MIPS IV microprocessors such as the R3000, R4000, R4400, R4600, R4700, and R10000. The fastest MIPS processors used in Sony NEWS workstations run at 200 MHz.

Both 680x0 and MIPS models share the same case, which has a large door covering a 3 1/2" micro-diskette drive and a 5.25-in expansion bay, which can house a SCSI tape or CD-ROM drive. The details of the door are slightly different: two windows for the 680x0 models, while the MIPS ones have a single large window. Also hidden by the cover are a reset button and a series of DIP switches used to configure some bootup parameters.

On the back are 3 expansion slots, one of which normally houses a video card. Underneath those are connectors for SCSI, network (an AUI connector), serial (CH0, normally used for console, and CH1), parallel, and a keyboard.

== Software ==
=== NEWS-OS ===
Originally, the Sony NEWS team had to decide which version of Unix to use: BSD or AT&T System V. The project leader was interested in the potential commercial support for System V, but the engineering team preferred BSD because it had rich networking features, including TCP/IP. Eventually BSD was chosen because they believed that computer networks would be important in the future.

NEWS-OS releases were based on three different versions of Unix:

- NEWS-OS 1.x: 4.2BSD, Shift JIS, introduced in 1987
- NEWS-OS 2.x: 4.2BSD, Shift JIS, introduced in 1987
- NEWS-OS 3.x: 4.3BSD, EUC, introduced in 1988
- NEWS-OS 4.x: 4.3BSD, EUC, introduced in 1990
- NEWS-OS 5.x: SVR4.2, EUC, introduced in 1992
- NEWS-OS 6.x: SVR4.2, EUC, introduced in 1993

Prior to NEWS-OS 3.9, all versions of NEWS-OS were released exclusively for the 680x0 series of processors. NEWS-OS 3.9 was released in both CISC ("C") versions and RISC ("R") versions, for the 680x0 and the MIPS architecture, respectively. For example, NEWS-OS 3.9 was released as "NEWS-OS 3.9C" and "NEWS-OS 3.9R", with the same functionality in both the CISC and RISC versions. The NEWS-OS 4.x series was also released in both CISC and RISC versions.

=== Third-party software ===
Yukihiro Matsumoto originally implemented the Ruby programming language on the 4.3BSD-based NEWS-OS 3.x, but later migrated his work to SunOS 4.x, and finally to Linux. In 1999, Ruby was known to work across many different operating systems, including NEWS-OS.

== See also ==
- EWS-UX
