= Project Monterey =

1990s Unix coalition

Logo for Project Monterey

Project Monterey was an attempt to build a single Unix operating system that ran across a variety of 32-bit and 64-bit platforms, as well as supporting multi-processing. It would allow applications to run across a wide selection of machines, at a time when compatibility between platforms was limited and this was seen as a major barrier to the more widespread adoption of Unix-based platforms. Although it would run on most processors of the era, the main focus of the project was to create an enterprise-class UNIX for the upcoming IA-64, which at the time was expected to eventually dominate the server market. The rise of Linux and the failure of the IA-64 program led to its supporters abandoning the project.

Announced in October 1998, the project involved several Unix vendors; IBM provided POWER and PowerPC support from AIX, Santa Cruz Operation (SCO) provided IA-32 support, and Sequent added multi-processing (MP) support from their DYNIX/ptx system. Intel Corporation provided expertise and ISV development funding for porting to their upcoming IA-64 (Itanium Architecture) CPU platform, which was yet to be released at that time.

By March 2001, however, "the explosion in popularity of Linux ... prompted IBM to quietly ditch" this; all involved attempted to find a niche in the rapidly developing Linux market and moved their focus away from Monterey. Sequent was acquired by IBM in 1999. In 2000, SCO's UNIX business was purchased by Caldera Systems, a Linux distributor, who later renamed themselves the SCO Group. In the same year, IBM eventually declared Monterey dead. Intel, IBM, Caldera Systems, and others had also been running a parallel effort to port Linux to IA-64, Project Trillian, which delivered workable code in February 2000. In late 2000, IBM announced a major effort to support Linux.

In May 2001, the project announced the availability of a beta test version AIX-5L for IA-64, almost meeting its original primary goal. However, Intel had missed its delivery date for its first Itanium processor by two years, and the Monterey software had no market.

With the exception of the IA-64 port and Dynix MP improvements, much of the Monterey effort was an attempt to standardize existing versions of Unix into a single compatible system. Such efforts had been undertaken in the past (e.g., 3DA) and had generally failed, as the companies involved were too reliant on vendor lock-in to fully support a standard that would allow their customers to leave for other products. With Monterey, two of the key partners already had a niche they expected to continue to serve in the future: POWER and IA-64 for IBM, IA-32 and IA-64 for SCO.

The breakdown of Project Monterey was one of the factors leading to a lawsuit in 2003, where SCO Group sued IBM over their contributions to Linux.

IBM sold only 32 Monterey licenses in 2001, and fewer in 2002.
