= UNIX System V =

Early commercial UNIX operating system

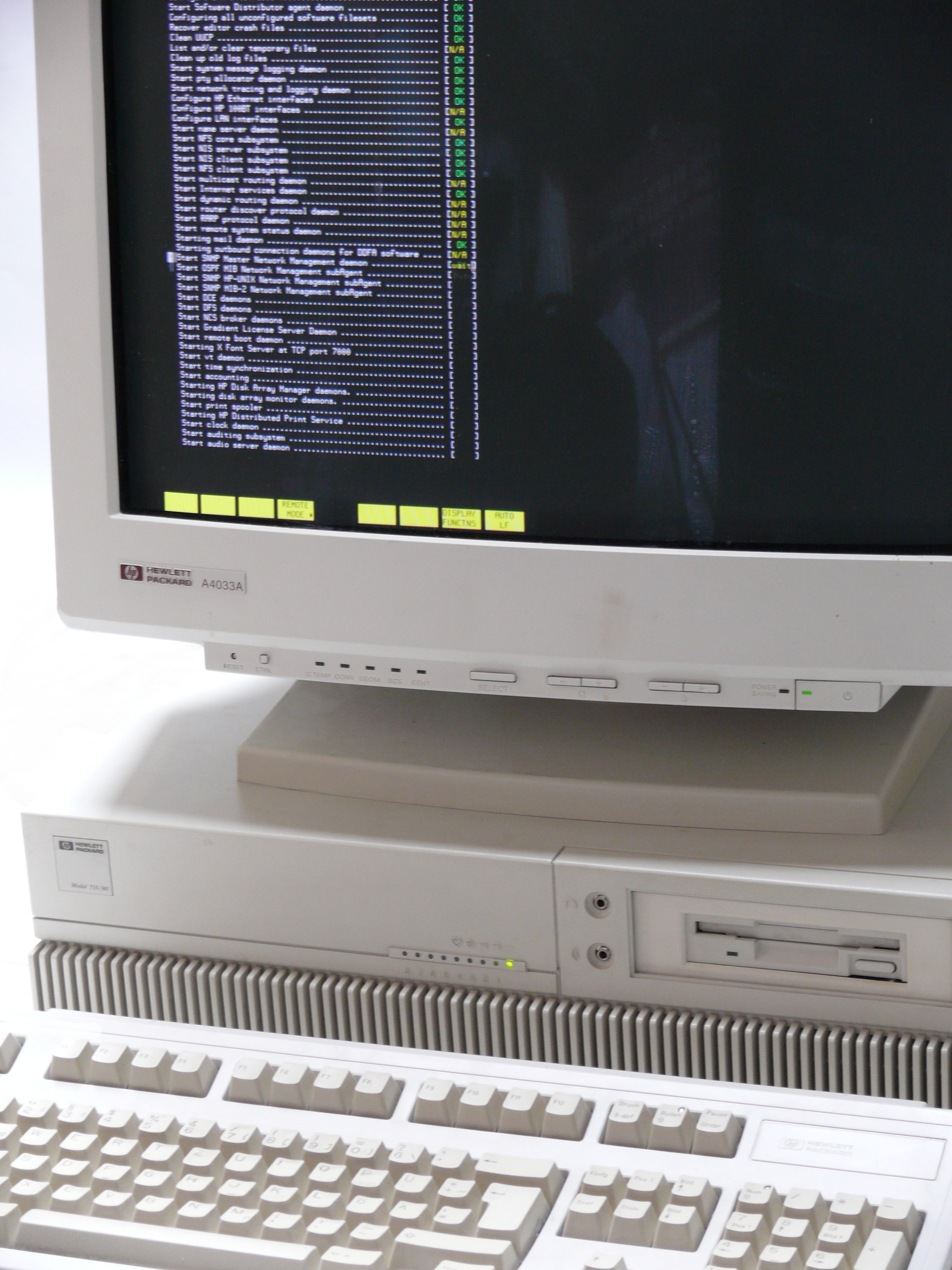
- HP 9000 workstation booting HP-UX, Hewlett-Packard's System V
- Developer: AT&T Corporation
- Written in: C
- OS family: Unix
- Working state: Historic
- Source model: Closed source except for OpenSolaris and its derivatives
- Initial release: 1983; 43 years ago
- Available in: English
- Default user interface: Command-line interface
- Preceded by: UNIX System III
- Succeeded by: UnixWare

UNIX System V (pronounced: "System Five") is one of the first commercial versions of the Unix operating system. It was originally developed by AT&T and first released in 1983. Four major versions of System V were released, numbered 1, 2, 3, and 4. System V Release 4 (SVR4) was commercially the most successful version, being the result of an effort, marketed as Unix System Unification, which solicited the collaboration of the major Unix vendors. It was the source of several common commercial Unix features. System V is sometimes abbreviated to SysV.

As of 2026, the AT&T-derived Unix market is divided between three System V variants: IBM's AIX, Oracle's Solaris, and the free-software illumos forked from OpenSolaris.

== Overview ==
=== Introduction ===
Unix history tree

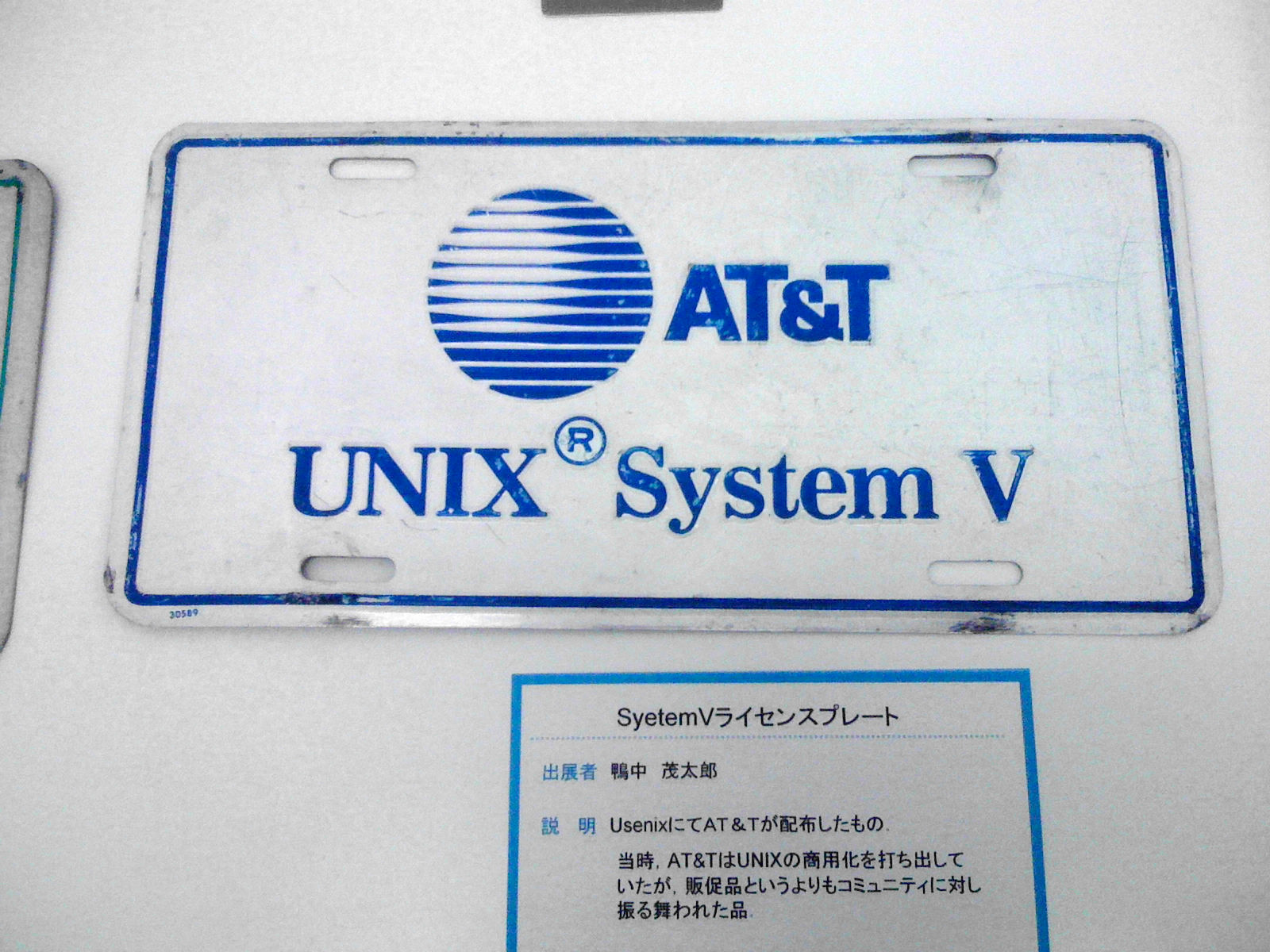
AT&T System V license plate

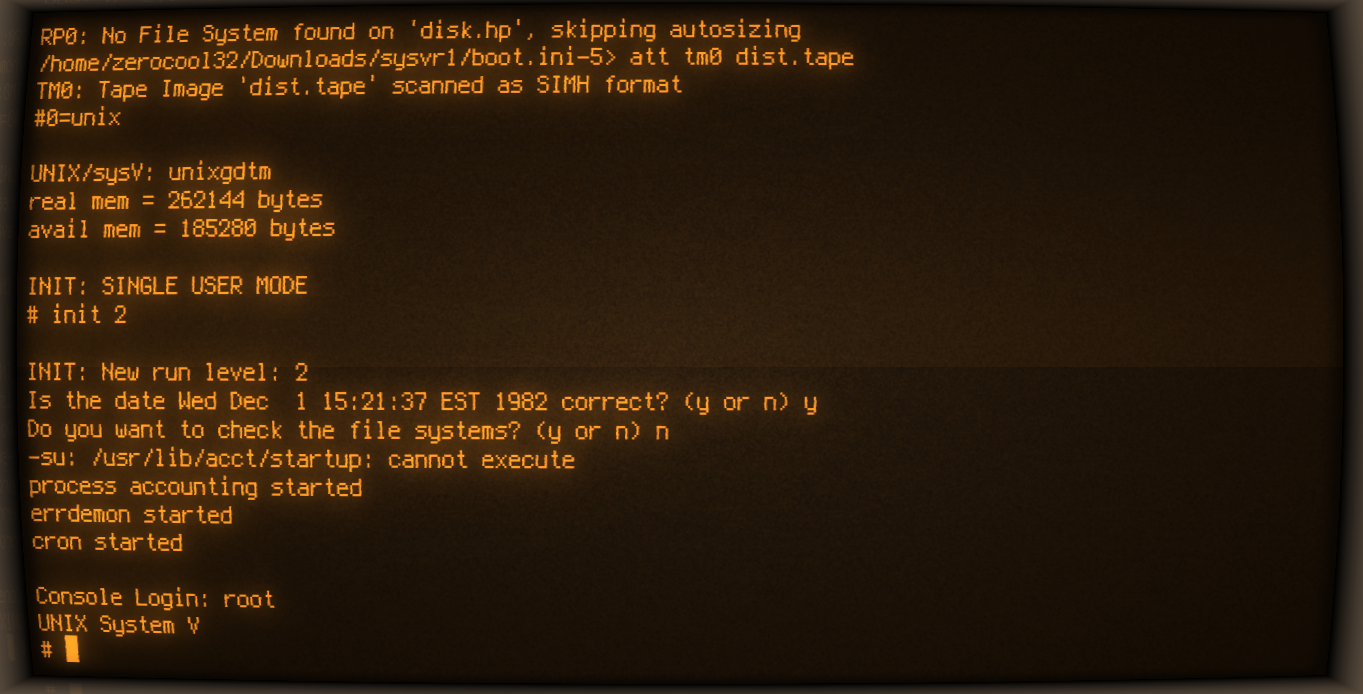
UNIX System V Release 1 on SIMH (PDP-11)

System V was the successor to 1982's UNIX System III. While AT&T developed and sold hardware that ran System V, most customers ran a version from a reseller, based on AT&T's reference implementation. A standards document called the System V Interface Definition outlined the default features and behavior of implementations.

=== AT&T support ===
During the formative years of AT&T's computer business, the division went through several phases of System V software groups, beginning with the Unix Support Group (USG), followed by Unix System Development Laboratory (USDL), followed by AT&T Information Systems (ATTIS), and finally Unix System Laboratories (USL).

=== Rivalry with BSD ===
In the 1980s and early-1990s, UNIX System V and the Berkeley Software Distribution (BSD) were the two major versions of UNIX. Historically, BSD was also commonly called "BSD Unix" or "Berkeley Unix". Eric S. Raymond summarized the longstanding relationship and rivalry between System V and BSD during the early period:

In fact, for years after divestiture the Unix community was preoccupied with the first phase of the Unix wars – an internal dispute, the rivalry between System V Unix and BSD Unix. The dispute had several levels, some technical (sockets vs. STREAMS, BSD tty vs. System V termio) and some cultural. The divide was roughly between longhairs and shorthairs; programmers and technical people tended to line up with Berkeley and BSD, more business-oriented types with AT&T and System V.

While HP, IBM and others chose System V as the basis for their Unix offerings, other vendors such as Sun Microsystems and DEC extended BSD. Throughout its development, though, System V was infused with features from BSD, while BSD variants such as DEC's Ultrix received System V features. AT&T and Sun Microsystems worked together to merge System V with BSD-based SunOS to produce Solaris, one of the primary System V descendants still maintained in the 2020s. Since the early 1990s, due to standardization efforts such as POSIX and the success of Linux, the division between System V and BSD has become less important.

== Releases ==
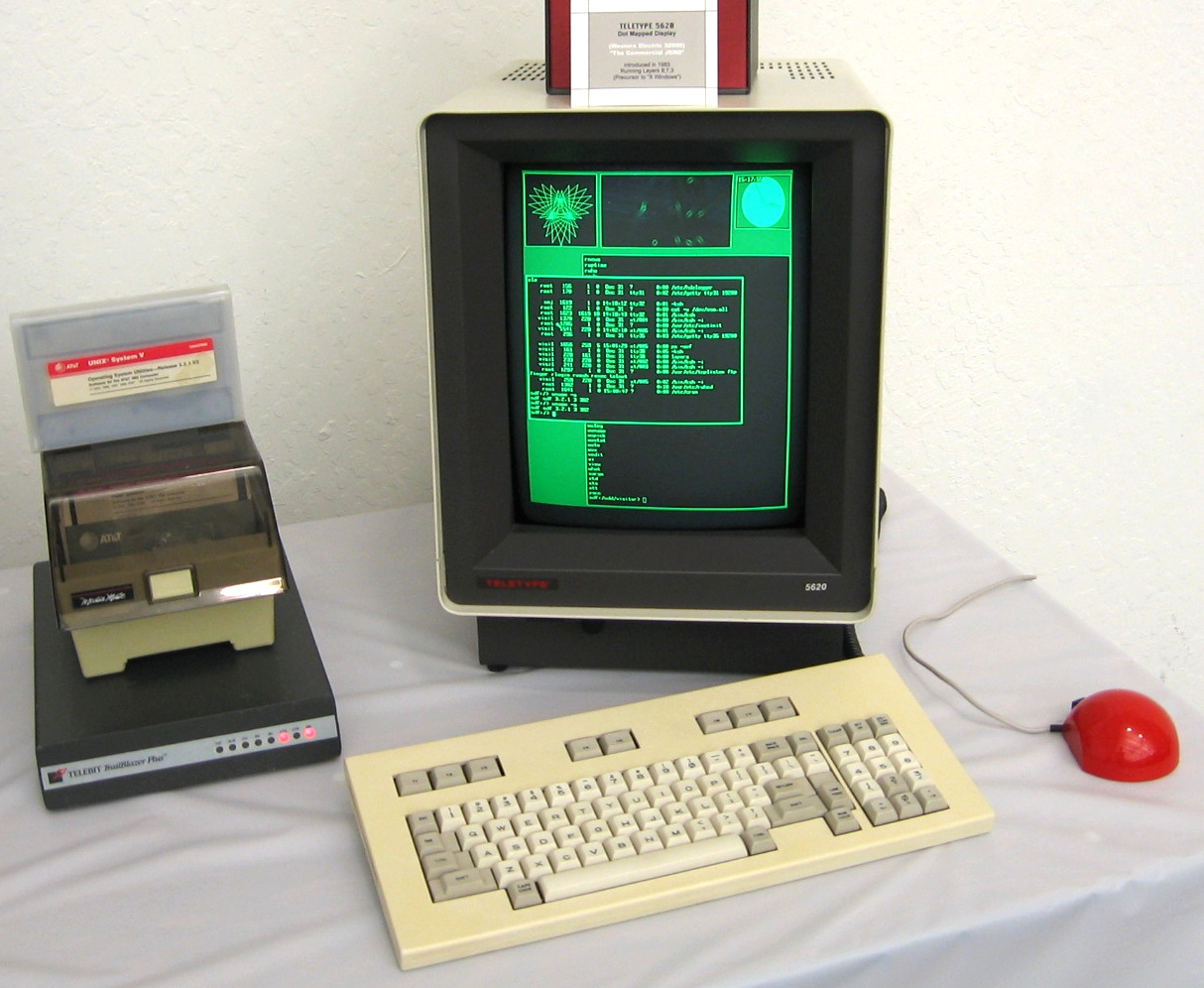
DMD 5620 terminal, based on the Blit, connected to a SVR3 host and showing the Layers interface

=== SVR1 ===
System V, known inside Bell Labs as Unix 5.0, succeeded AT&T's previous commercial Unix called System III in January 1983. Unix 4.0 was never released externally, which would have been designated as System IV. This first release of System V (called System V.0, System V Release 1, or SVR1) was developed by AT&T's UNIX Support Group (USG) and based on the Bell Labs internal USG UNIX 5.0.

System V also included features such as the vi editor and curses from 4.1 BSD, developed at the University of California, Berkeley; it also improved performance by adding buffer and inode caches. It also added support for inter-process communication using messages, semaphores, and shared memory, developed earlier for the Bell-internal CB UNIX.

SVR1 ran on DEC PDP-11 and VAX minicomputers.

=== SVR2 ===
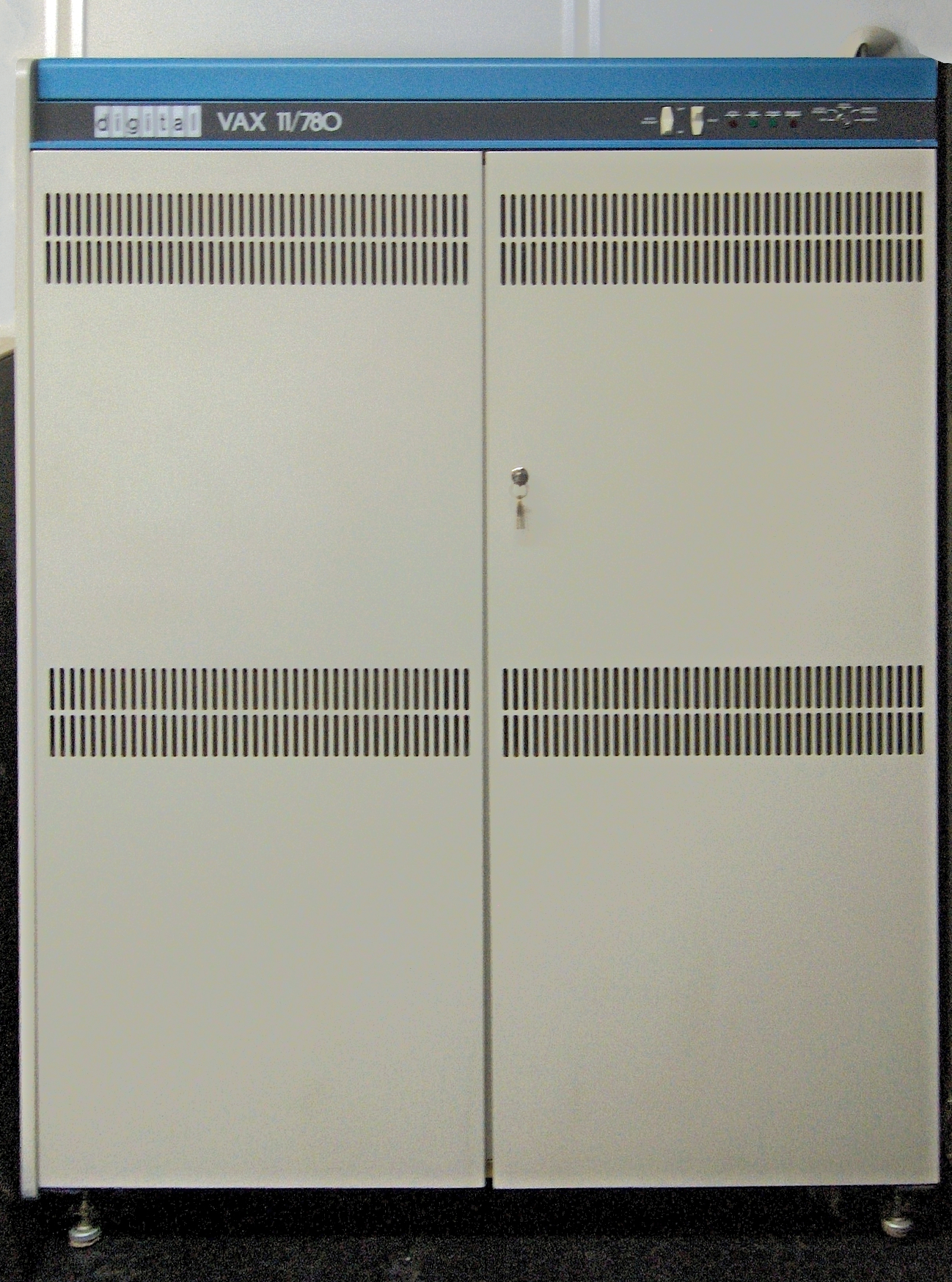
The DEC VAX-11/780 was the porting base for SVR2.

AT&T's UNIX Support Group (USG) transformed into the UNIX System Development Laboratory (USDL), which released System V Release 2 in 1984. SVR2 added shell functions and the SVID. SVR2.4 added demand paging, copy-on-write, shared memory, and record and file locking.

The concept of the "porting base" was formalized, and the DEC VAX-11/780 was chosen for this release. The "porting base" is the so-called original version of a release, from which all porting efforts for other machines emanate.

Educational source licenses for SVR2 were offered by AT&T for US$800 for the first CPU, and $400 for each additional CPU. A commercial source license was offered for $43,000, with three months of support, and a $16,000 price per additional CPU.

Apple Computer's A/UX operating system was initially based on this release. Microsoft Xenix 5.0 also used SVR2 as its basis. The first release of HP-UX was also an SVR2 derivative.

Maurice J. Bach's book, The Design of the UNIX Operating System, is the definitive description of the SVR2 kernel, with some new features from Release 3 and BSD.

=== SVR3 ===
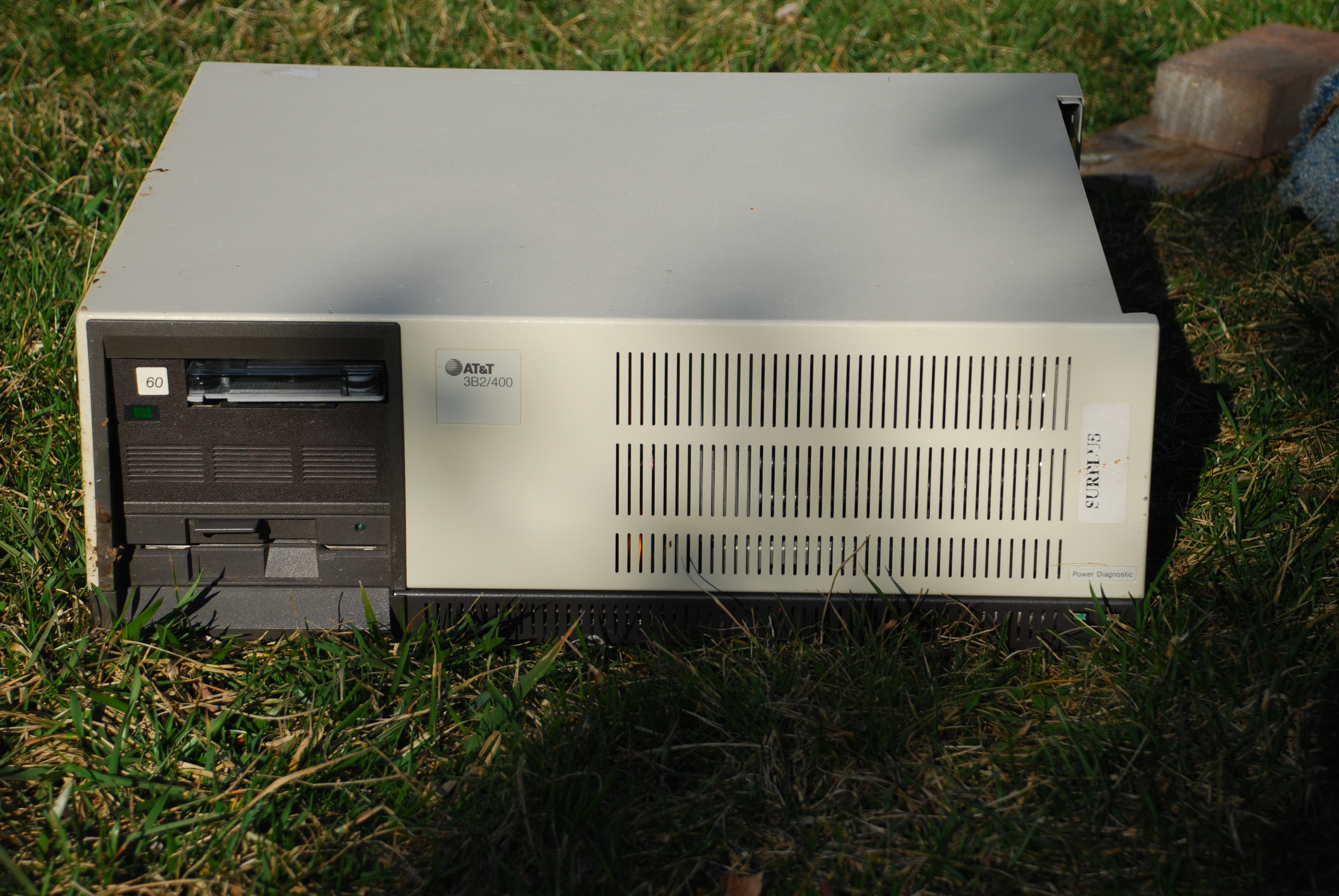
The AT&T 3B2 line of minicomputers was the porting base for SVR3.

AT&T's UNIX System Development Laboratory (USDL) was succeeded by AT&T Information Systems (ATTIS), which distributed UNIX System V, Release 3, in 1987. SVR3 included STREAMS, Remote File Sharing (RFS), the File System Switch (FSS) virtual file system mechanism, a restricted form of shared libraries, and the Transport Layer Interface (TLI) network API. The final version was Release 3.2 in 1988, which added binary compatibility to Xenix on Intel platforms (see Intel Binary Compatibility Standard).

User interface improvements included the "layers" windowing system for the DMD 5620 graphics terminal, and the SVR3.2 curses libraries that offered eight or more color pairs and other at this time important features (forms, panels, menus, etc.). The AT&T 3B2 became the official "porting base."

SCO UNIX was based upon SVR3.2, as was ISC 386/ix. Among the more obscure distributions of SVR3.2 for the 386 were ESIX 3.2 by Everex and "System V, Release 3.2" sold by Intel themselves; these two shipped "plain vanilla" AT&T's codebase.

IBM's AIX operating system is an SVR3 derivative.

=== SVR4 ===
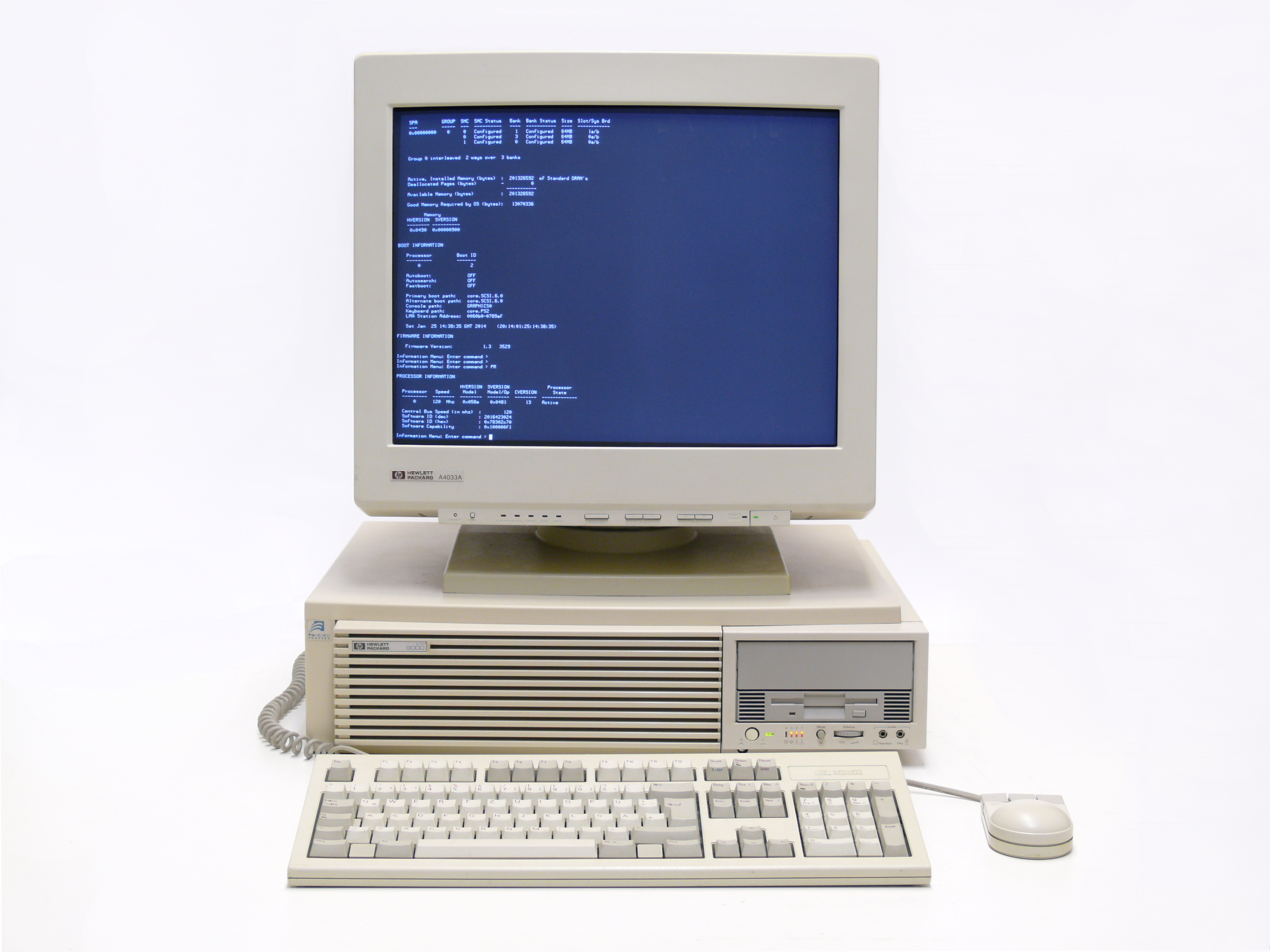
HP 9000 C110 running HP-UX in console mode

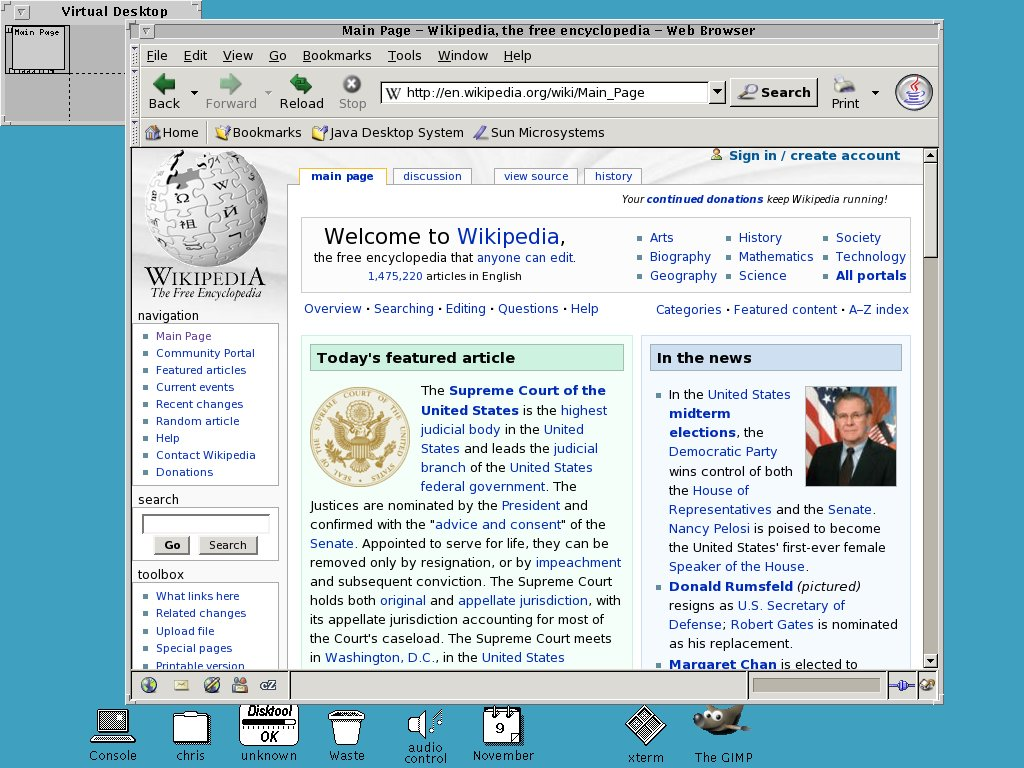
OpenWindows, an early desktop environment for SVR4

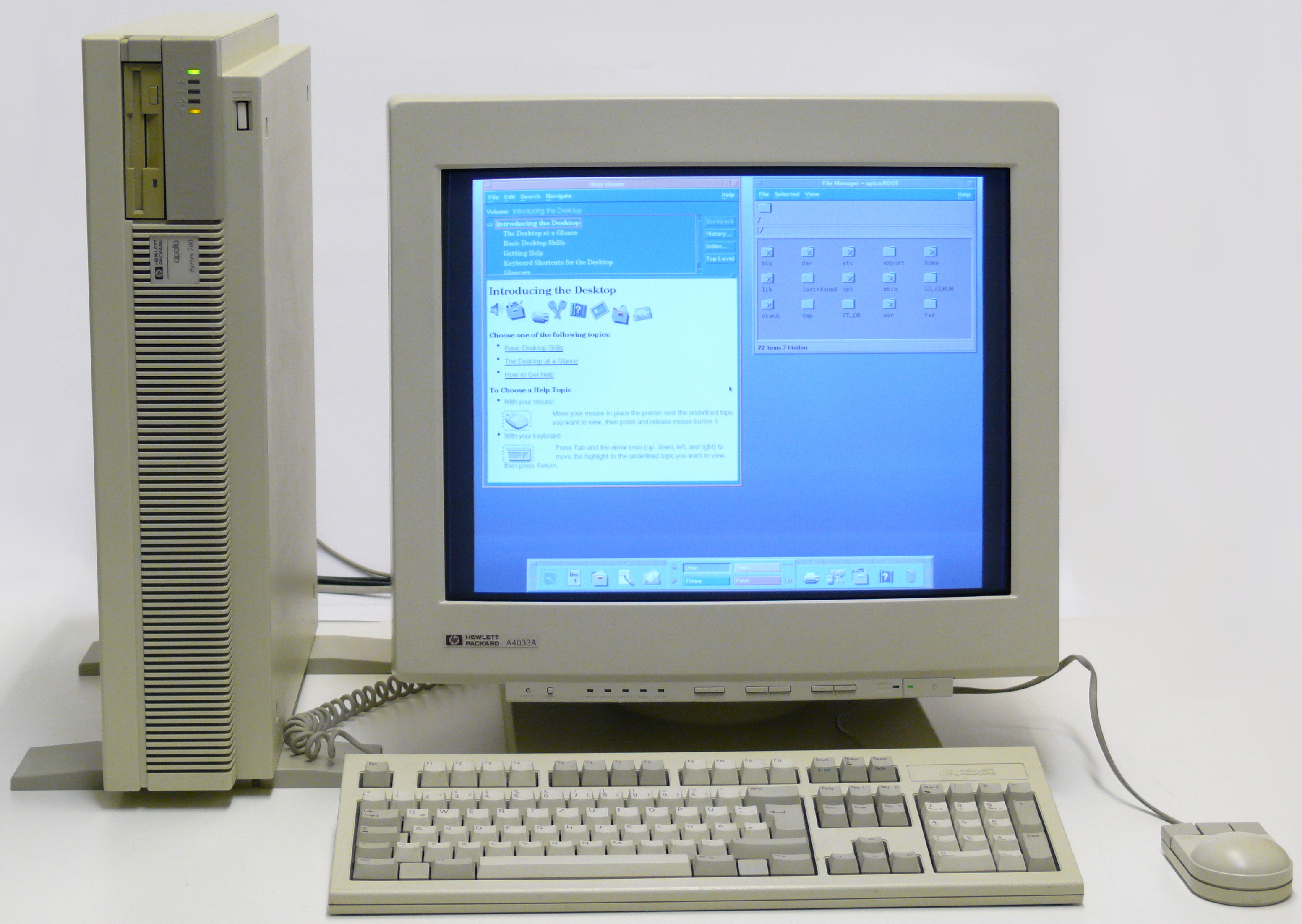
HP 9000 735 running HP-UX with the Common Desktop Environment (CDE)

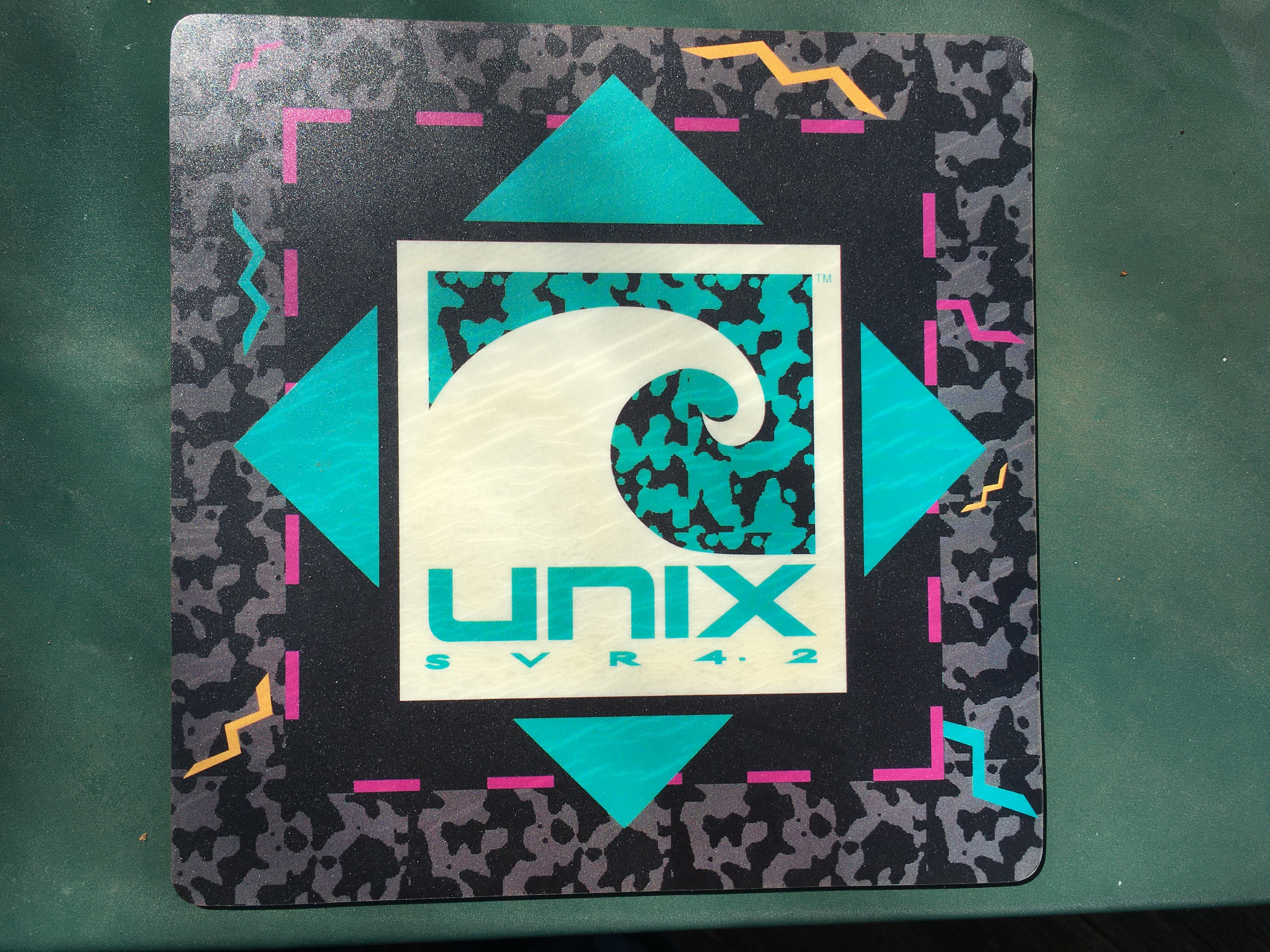
'Catch the wave' promotional mousepad for SVR4.2

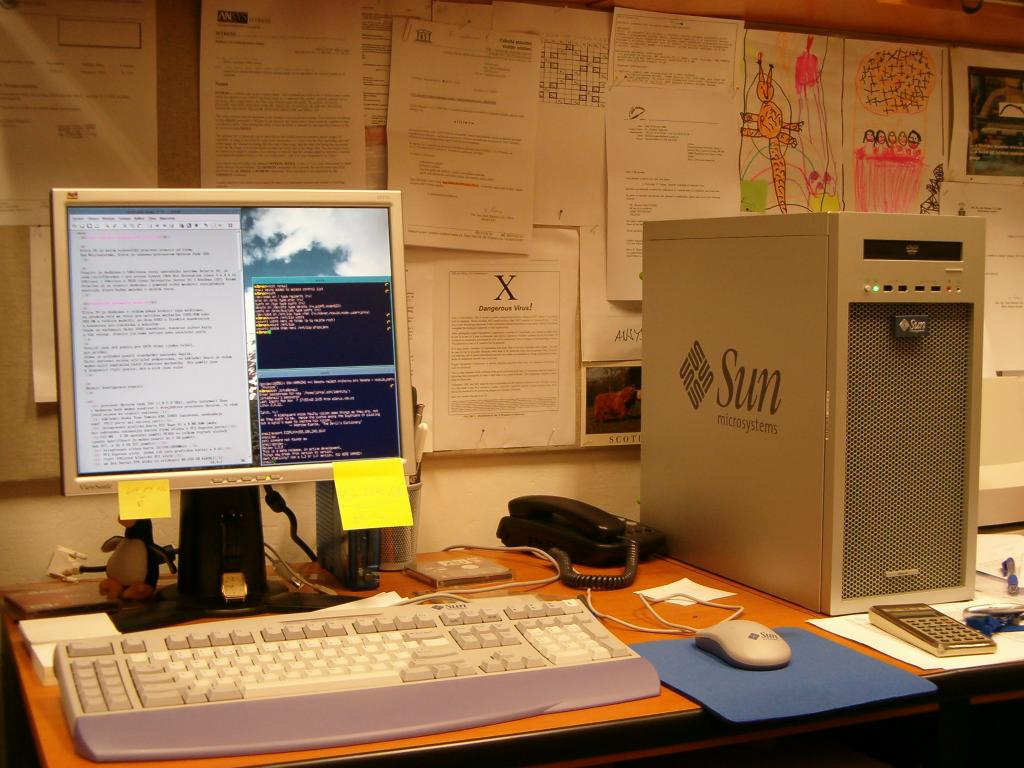
Sun Ultra 20 with Solaris 10

System V Release 4.0 was announced on 18 October 1988 and was incorporated into a variety of commercial Unix products from early 1989 onwards. A joint project of AT&T Unix System Laboratories and Sun Microsystems, it combined technology from:

- SVR3
- 4.3BSD
- Xenix
- SunOS

New features included:

- From BSD:
  - TCP/IP support
  - Sockets
  - UFS
  - Support for multiple groups
  - C shell
- From SunOS:
  - Virtual file system interface (replacing File System Switch in System V Release 3)
  - NFS
  - New virtual memory system including support for memory mapped files
  - Improved shared library system based on the SunOS 4.x model
  - OpenWindows GUI environment
  - External Data Representation (XDR) and ONC RPC
- From Xenix:
  - x86 device drivers
  - Binary compatibility with Xenix (in the x86 version of System V)
- KornShell
- ANSI X3J11 C compatibility
- Multi-National Language Support (MNLS)
- Better internationalization support
- An application binary interface (ABI) based on Executable and Linkable Format (ELF)
- Support for standards such as POSIX and X/Open

Many companies licensed SVR4 and bundled it with computer systems such as workstations and network servers. SVR4 systems vendors included Atari (Atari System V), Commodore (Amiga Unix), Data General (DG/UX), Fujitsu (UXP/DS), Hitachi (HI-UX), Hewlett-Packard (HP-UX), NCR (Unix/NS), NEC (EWS-UX, UP-UX, UX/4800, SUPER-UX), OKI (OKI System V), Pyramid Technology (DC/OSx), SGI (IRIX), Siemens (SINIX), Sony (NEWS-OS), Sumitomo Electric Industries (SEIUX), and Sun Microsystems (Solaris) with illumos in the 2010s as the only open-source platform.

Software porting houses also sold enhanced and supported Intel x86 versions. SVR4 software vendors included Dell (Dell UNIX), Everex (ESIX), Micro Station Technology (SVR4), Microport (SVR4), and UHC (SVR4).

The primary platforms for SVR4 were Intel x86 and SPARC; the SPARC version, called Solaris 2 (or, internally, SunOS 5.x), was developed by Sun. The relationship between Sun and AT&T was terminated after the release of SVR4, meaning that later versions of Solaris did not inherit features of later SVR4.x releases. Sun would in 2005 release most of the source code for Solaris 10 (SunOS 5.10) as the open-source OpenSolaris project, creating, with its forks, the only open-source (albeit heavily modified) System V implementation available. After Oracle took over Sun, Solaris was forked into proprietary release, but illumos as the continuation project is being developed in open-source.

A consortium of Intel-based resellers including Unisys, ICL, NCR Corporation, and Olivetti developed SVR4.0MP with multiprocessing capability (allowing system calls to be processed from any processor, but interrupt servicing only from a "master" processor).

Release 4.1 ES (Enhanced Security) added security features required for Orange Book B2 compliance and Access Control Lists and support for dynamic loading of kernel modules.

=== SVR4.2 / UnixWare ===
In 1992, AT&T USL engaged in a joint venture with Novell, called Univel. That year saw the release System V.4.2 as Univel UnixWare, featuring the Veritas File System. Other vendors included UHC and Consensys.

Release 4.2MP, completed late 1993, added support for multiprocessing and it was released as UnixWare 2 in 1995.

Eric S. Raymond warned prospective buyers about SVR4.2 versions, as they often did not include on-line man pages. In his 1994 buyers guide, he attributes this change in policy to Unix System Laboratories.

=== SVR5 / UnixWare 7 ===
The Santa Cruz Operation (SCO), owners of Xenix, eventually acquired the UnixWare trademark and the distribution rights to the System V Release 4.2 codebase from Novell, while other vendors (Sun, IBM, HP) continued to use and extend System V Release 4. Novell transferred ownership of the Unix trademark to The Open Group.

System V Release 5 was developed in 1997 by the Santa Cruz Operation (SCO) as a merger of SCO OpenServer (an SVR3-derivative) and UnixWare, with a focus on large-scale servers. It was released as SCO UnixWare 7. SCO's successor, The SCO Group, also based SCO OpenServer 6 on SVR5, but the codebase is not used by any other major developer or reseller.

=== SVR6 (cancelled) ===
System V Release 6 was announced by SCO to be released by the end of 2004, but was apparently cancelled. It was supposed to support 64-bit systems. SCO also introduced Smallfoot in 2004, a low-resource "embeddable" variant of UnixWare for dedicated commercial and industrial applications, in an attempt that was perceived as a response to the growing popularity of Linux. The industry has since coalesced around The Open Group's Single UNIX Specification version 3 (UNIX 03).

== Market position ==
=== Availability during the 1990s on x86 platforms ===
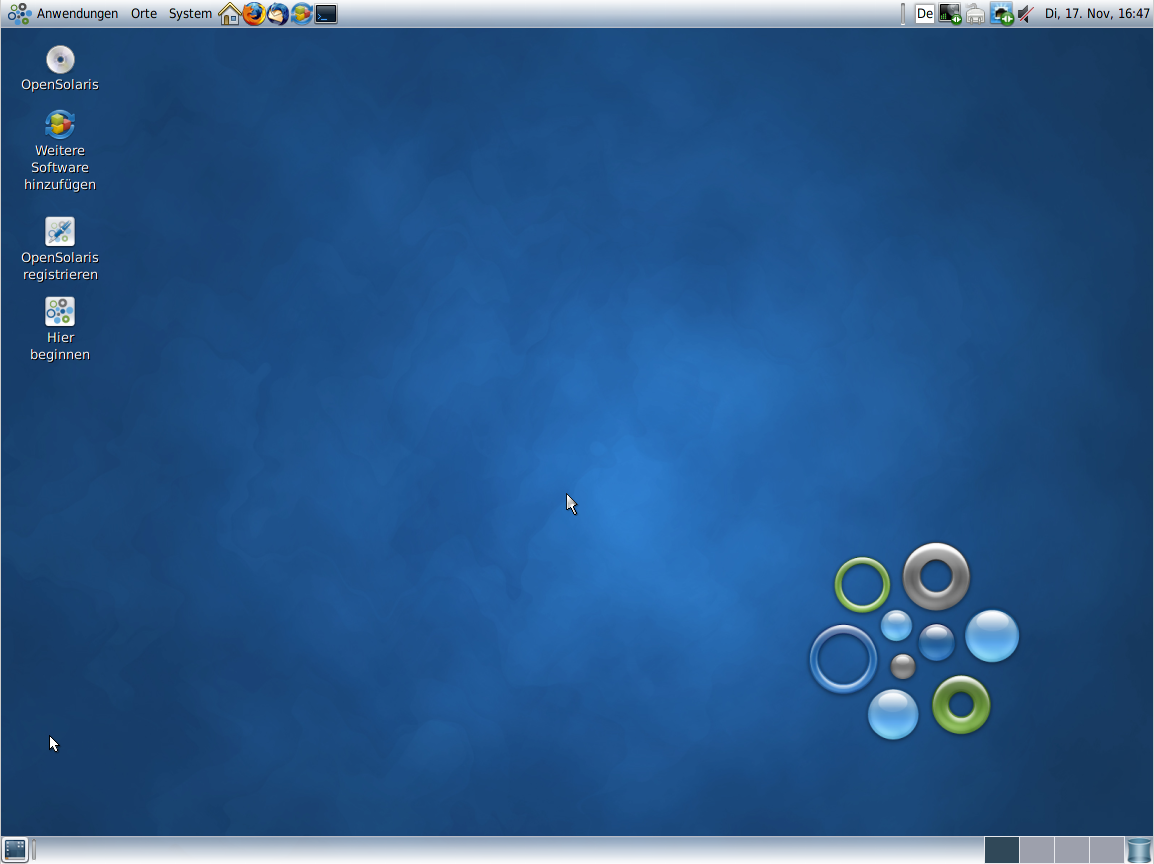
A GNOME-based OpenSolaris desktop, OpenSolaris was one of the SVR4 varieties available for x86 platforms

In the 1980s and 1990s, a variety of SVR4 versions of Unix were available commercially for the x86 PC platform. However, the market for commercial Unix on PCs declined after Linux and BSD became widely available. In late 1994, Eric S. Raymond discontinued his PC-clone UNIX Software Buyer's Guide on USENET, stating, "The reason I am dropping this is that I run Linux now, and I no longer find the SVr4 market interesting or significant."

In 1998, a confidential memo at Microsoft stated, "Linux is on track to eventually own the x86 UNIX market", and further predicted, "I believe that Linux – moreso than NT – will be the biggest threat to SCO in the near future."

An InfoWorld article from 2001 characterized SCO UnixWare as having a "bleak outlook" due to being "trounced" in the market by Linux and Solaris, and IDC predicted that SCO would "continue to see a shrinking share of the market".

=== Project Monterey ===
Project Monterey was started in 1998 to combine major features of existing commercial Unix platforms, as a joint project of Compaq, IBM, Intel, SCO, and Sequent Computer Systems. The target platform was meant to be Intel's new IA-64 architecture and Itanium line of processors. However, the project was abruptly canceled in 2001 after little progress.

=== System V and the Unix market ===
By 2001, several major Unix variants such as SCO UnixWare, Compaq Tru64 UNIX, and SGI IRIX were all in decline. The three major Unix versions doing well in the market were IBM AIX, Hewlett-Packard's HP-UX, and Sun's Solaris.

In 2006, when SGI declared bankruptcy, analysts questioned whether Linux would replace proprietary Unix altogether. In a 2006 article written for Computerworld by Mark Hall, the economics of Linux were cited as a major factor driving the migration from Unix to Linux:

Linux's success in high-end, scientific and technical computing, like Unix's before it, preceded its success in your data center. Once Linux proved itself by executing the most complex calculations possible, IT managers quickly grasped that it could easily serve Web pages and run payroll. Naturally, it helps to be lucky: Free, downloadable Linux's star began to rise during one of the longest downturns in IT history. With companies doing more with less, one thing they could dump was Unix.

The article also cites trends in high-performance computing applications as evidence of a dramatic shift from Unix to Linux:

A look at the TOP500 list of supercomputers tells the tale best. In 1998, Unix machines from Sun and SGI combined for 46% of the 500 fastest computers in the world. Linux accounted for one (0.2%). In 2005, Sun had 0.8% — or four systems — and SGI had 3.6%, while 72% of the Top500 ran Linux.

In a November 2015 survey of the top 500 supercomputers, Unix was used by only 1.2% (all running IBM AIX), while Linux was used by 98.8%; the same survey in November 2017 reports 100% of them using Linux.

System V derivatives continued to be deployed on some proprietary server platforms. The principal variants of System V that remain in commercial use are AIX (IBM), Solaris (Oracle), and HP-UX (HP). According to a study done by IDC, in 2012 the worldwide Unix market was divided between IBM (56%), Oracle (19.2%), and HP (18.6%). No other commercial Unix vendor had more than 2% of the market. Industry analysts generally characterize proprietary Unix as having entered a period of slow but permanent decline.

=== OpenSolaris and illumos distributions ===
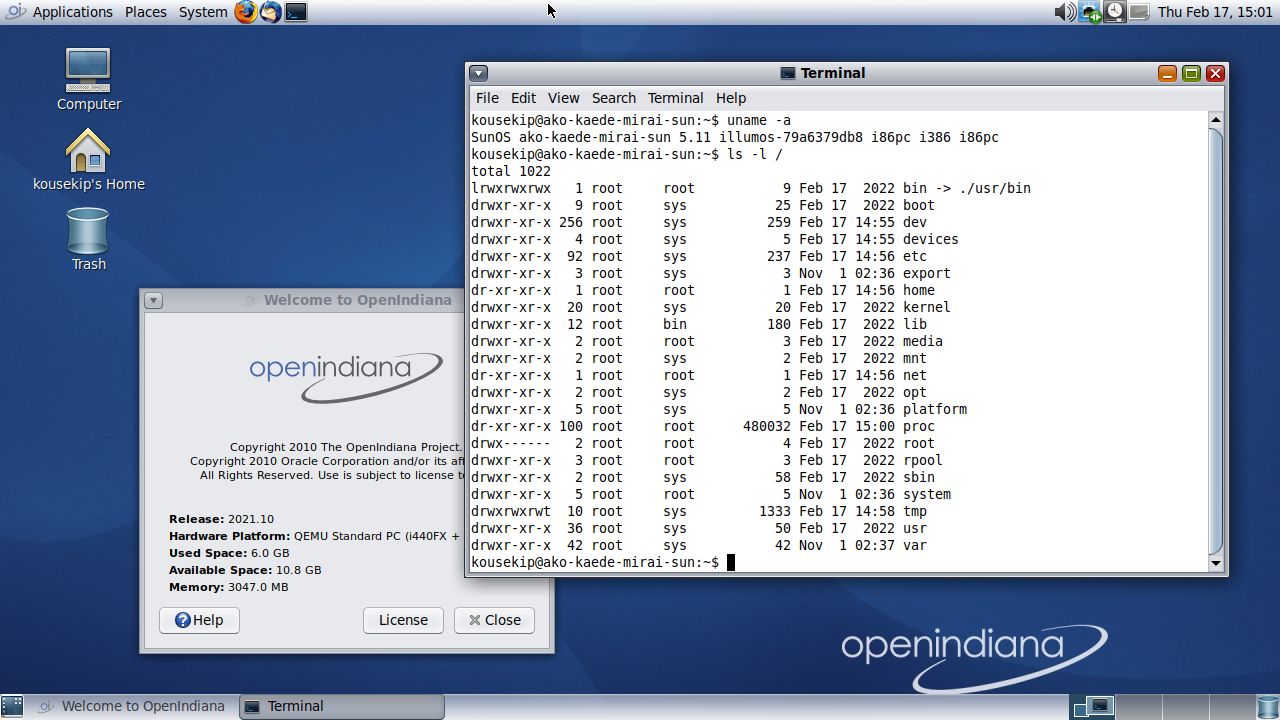
The MATE desktop on OpenIndiana, an SVR4 derivative

OpenSolaris and its derivatives are the only SVR4 descendants that are open-source software. Core system software continues to be developed as illumos, which is used in illumos distributions such as SmartOS, OpenIndiana and others.

=== System V compatibility ===
The System V interprocess communication mechanisms are available in Unix-like operating systems not derived from System V; in particular, in Linux (a reimplementation of Unix) as well as the BSD derivative FreeBSD. POSIX.1-2008 specifies a replacement for these interfaces.

FreeBSD maintains a binary compatibility layer for the COFF format, which allows FreeBSD to execute binaries compiled for some SVR3.2 derivatives such as SCO UNIX and Interactive UNIX. Modern System V, Linux, and BSD platforms use the ELF file format for natively compiled binaries.
