= Secure operating system =

Secure operating system may refer to:

- Security-focused operating system
- Security-evaluated operating system, operating systems that have achieved certification from an external security-auditing organization
- Trusted operating system, an operating system that provides sufficient support for multilevel security and evidence of correctness to meet a particular set of requirements
