= Compartmentalization (information security) =

Limiting access to information on a need-to-know basis

Compartmentalization, in information security, whether public or private, is the limiting of access to information to persons or other entities on a need-to-know basis to perform certain tasks.

It originated in the handling of classified information in military and intelligence applications. It dates back to antiquity, and was successfully used to keep the secret of Greek fire.

The basis for compartmentalization is the idea that, if fewer people know the details of a mission or task, the risk or likelihood that such information will be compromised or fall into the hands of the opposition is decreased. Hence, varying levels of clearance within organizations exist. Yet, even if someone has the highest clearance, certain "compartmentalized" information, identified by codewords referring to particular types of secret information, may still be restricted to certain operators, even with a lower overall security clearance. Information marked this way is said to be codeword–classified. One famous example of this was the Ultra secret, where documents were marked "Top Secret Ultra": "Top Secret" marked its security level, and the "Ultra" keyword further restricted its readership to only those cleared to read "Ultra" documents.

Compartmentalization is now also used in commercial security engineering as a technique to protect information such as medical records.

== Example ==
An example of compartmentalization was the Manhattan Project. Personnel at Oak Ridge constructed and operated centrifuges to isolate uranium-235 from naturally occurring uranium, but most did not know exactly what they were doing. Those that knew did not know why they were doing it. Parts of the weapon were separately designed by teams who did not know how the parts interacted.

== Security Architecture ==
Qubes OS Architecture Design Diagram shows how compromise of Firefox or Thunderbird (in AppVM 1) could not lead to compromise of the user's KeePass password manager (in AppVM 2), due to compartmentalization architecture

Compartmentalization is an architectural design practice where systems are isolated from one another to minimize the risk caused by a compromise of one system.

This is a fundamental design decision of some Operating Systems (using virtual machines), such as Qubes OS, Whonix, and KickSecure. In addition, some software use compartmentalization in virtual machines to sanitize potentially-malicious documents, such as Dangerzone.

Other security-focused software obtains compartmentalization through airgaps in physical machines, such as SecureDrop and Reach.

== See also ==
- Information sensitivity
- Principle of least privilege
- Sensitive compartmented information
