= Qubes OS =

Security-focused Linux-based operating system

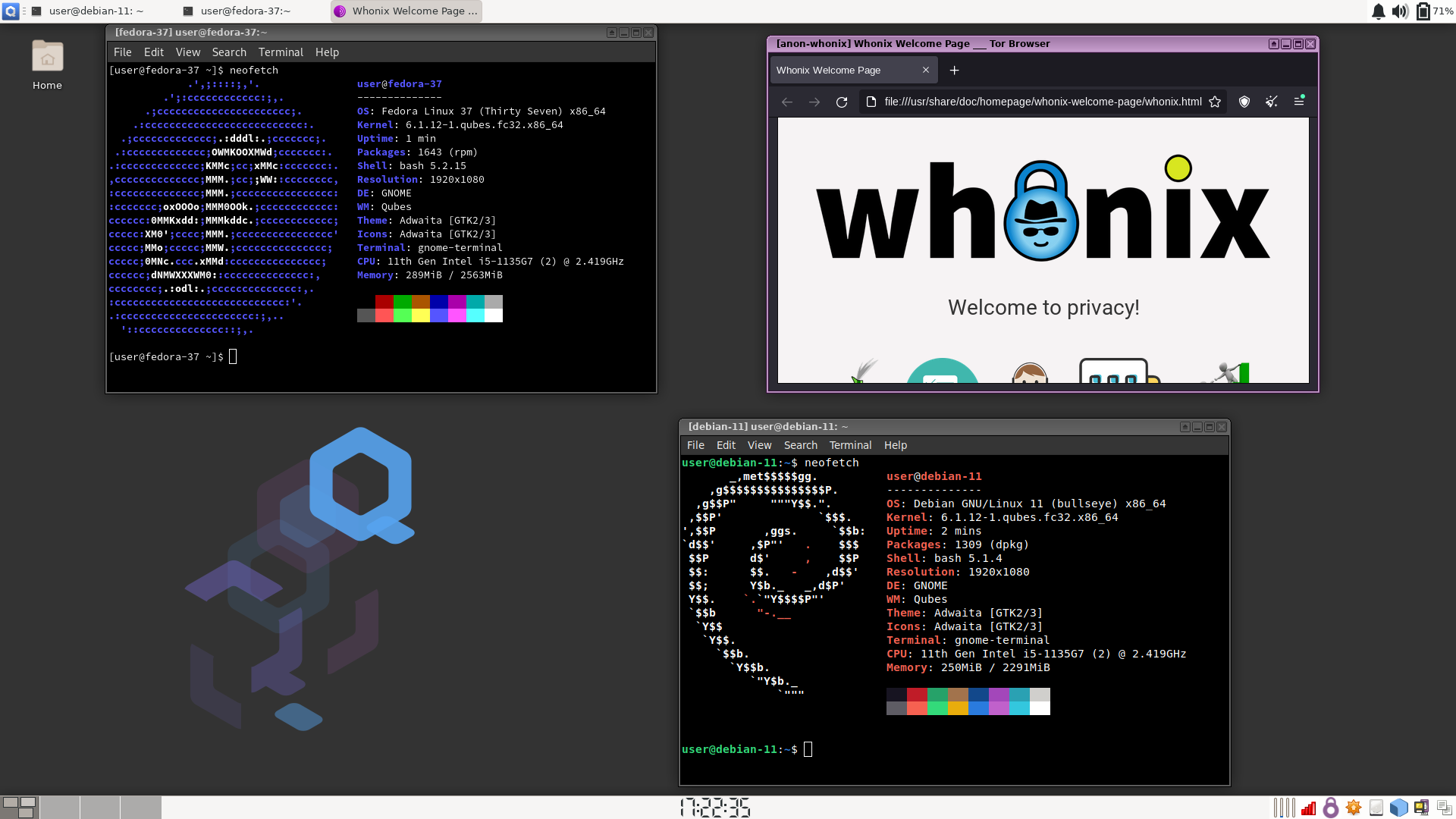
- Qubes OS 4.1.2 with its default Xfce DE running Fedora 37, Debian 11 and Whonix 16 virtualizations.
- Developer: The Qubes OS Project Invisible Things Labs Joanna Rutkowska
- OS family: Linux (Unix-like)
- Working state: Current
- Source model: Open source with proprietary blobs,
- Initial release: September 3, 2012; 14 years ago
- Latest release: 4.3.2 / 2 October 2026; 46 days ago
- Marketing target: security by compartmentalization, desktop, laptop
- Available in: Multilingual
- Update method: DNF (PackageKit)
- Package manager: RPM Package Manager
- Supported platforms: x86-64
- Kernel type: Microkernel (Xen Hypervisor running minimal Linux-based OSes and others)
- Userland: GNU (Note: The base (dom0) operating system in Qubes OS 4.2 is Fedora 37, which uses the GNU coreutils.): Official templates: Fedora; Debian; Community templates: Whonix; Ubuntu; Arch Linux; CentOS; Gentoo
- Default user interface: Xfce
- License: Free software licenses (mainly GPL v2)
- Official website: qubes-os.org; qubesosfasa4zl44o4tws22di6kepyzfeqv3tg4e3ztknltfxqrymdad.onion ^{(Accessing link help)}
- Tagline: A Reasonably Secure Operating System

Qubes OS is a security-focused desktop operating system that aims to provide security through compartmentalization. Compartmentalization is provided through the use of virtualization technology. This allows the segmentation of applications into secure virtual machines called qubes. Virtualization services in Qubes OS are provided by the Xen hypervisor.

The runtimes of individual qubes are generally based on a unique system of underlying Operating system templates. Templates provide a single, immutable root file system which can be shared by multiple qubes. This approach has two major benefits. First, updates to a given template are automatically "inherited" by all qubes based on it. Second, shared templates can dramatically reduce storage requirements compared to separate VMs with a full operating install per secure domain.

The base installation of Qubes OS provides a number of officially supported templates based on the Fedora and Debian Linux distributions. Alternative community-supported templates include Whonix, Ubuntu, Arch Linux, CentOS, and Gentoo. Users may also create their own templates.

Operating Systems like Qubes OS are referred to in academia as Converged Multi-Level Secure (MLS) Systems. Other proposals of similar systems have surfaced and SecureView and VMware vSphere are commercial competitors.

== Security goals ==
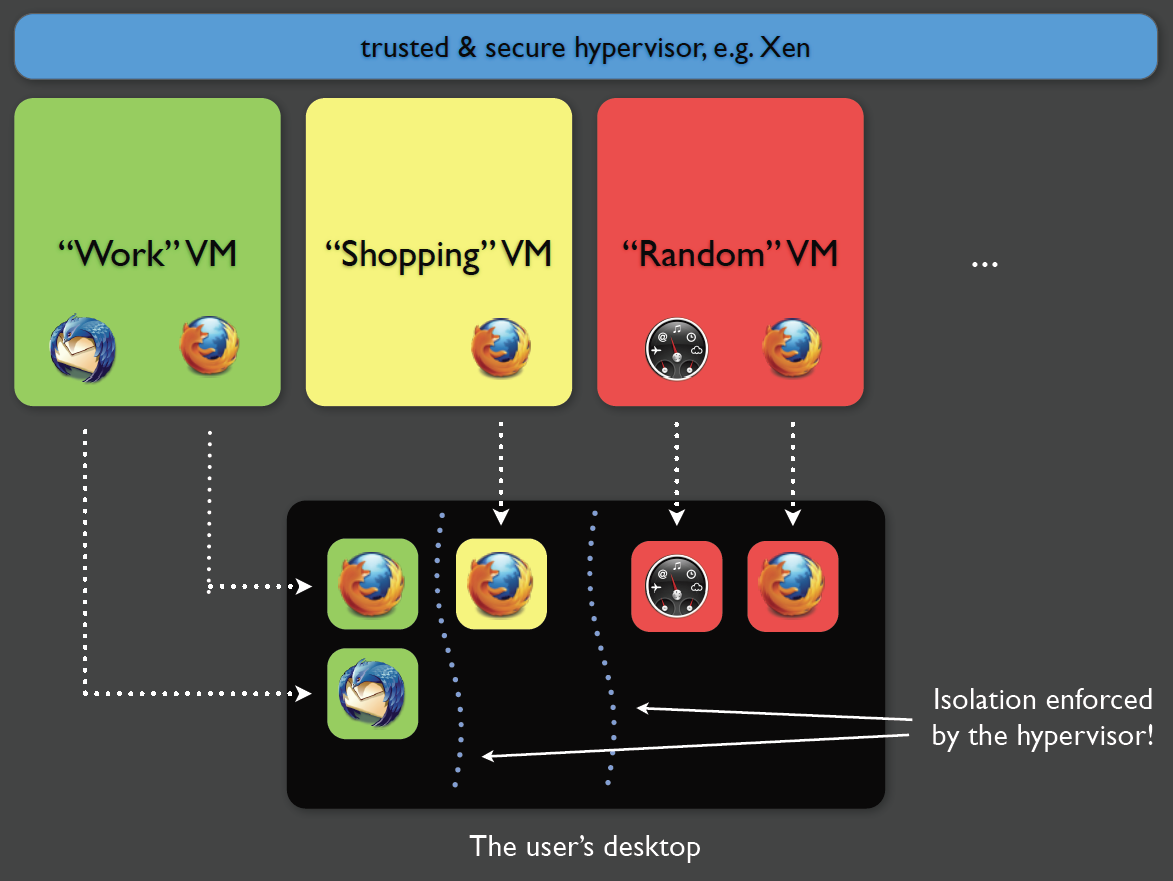
Security domains scheme

Qubes implements a Security by Isolation approach. The assumption is that there can be no perfect, bug-free desktop environment: such an environment counts millions of lines of code and billions of software/hardware interactions. One critical bug in any of these interactions may be enough for malicious software to take control of a machine.

To secure a desktop using Qubes OS, the user takes care to isolate various environments, so that if one of the components gets compromised, the malicious software would get access to only the data inside that environment.

In Qubes OS, the isolation is provided in two dimensions: hardware controllers can be isolated into functional domains (e.g. network domains, USB controller domains), whereas the user's digital life is divided into security domains with different levels of trust.

For instance: work domain (most trusted), shopping domain, random domain (less trusted). Each of these domains is run in a separate qube.

The qubes have passwordless root access (e.g. passwordless sudo) by default. UEFI Secure Boot is not supported out of the box. The Qubes OS team does not consider this a major security issue. Qubes is not a multiuser system.

== Installation and System Requirements ==
As a desktop-focused operating system, Qubes OS targets personal computer hardware. This market is dominated by laptops running Intel and AMD processors and chipsets.

The minimum base system requirements for Qubes OS are:

- 64-bit Intel or AMD processor with virtualization extensions (Note: Since 2013, Qubes OS only supports 64-bit processors. In addition, since release 4.x, Qubes OS requires either an Intel processor with support for VT-x with EPT and Intel VT-d or an AMD processor with support for AMD-V with RVI (SLAT) and AMD-Vi (aka AMD IOMMU). This is not a major issue for AMD processors since AMD IOMMU is functionally identical to Intel's VT-d.)
- 6 GB of RAM
- 32 GB of disk space

== User experience ==
Users interact with Qubes OS in much the same manner that they interact with any standard graphical desktop operating systems with some key differences:

- The creation of qubes (security domains) offers the means to create discrete, lean, secure application spaces by linking them to a complete root filesystem using shared templates.
- Applications launched from their respective qubes are distinguished by a unique colored window border.
- Opening an application for the first time in a given qube may incur a modest delay depending on system hardware.
- Sharing files and clipboard paste buffers utilize a special mechanism, as qubes do not share a common clipboard or file system.
- Users can create and manage as many qubes as desired to suit their specific requirements.

== System architecture overview ==
=== Xen hypervisor and domains ===
The Xen hypervisor provides strong isolation between its hosted virtual machines, called domains in Xen terminology.

The first domain started by Xen is the privileged administrative domain referred to as domain zero or more commonly dom0.

=== The Administrative domain: dom0 ===
As of Qubes OS 4.1.2, the operating system running in dom0 is Fedora Linux running a paravirtualized Linux kernel. It is the Linux kernel in dom0 that controls and brokers access to all the physical system hardware, via standard Linux kernel device drivers.

The operating system hosts the user's graphical desktop and controls most hardware devices. This includes the graphics device, USB ports, storage and input devices, such as the keyboard and mouse. The base graphical desktop is composed of the X server, the Xfwm window manager and the Xfce desktop.

By design, dom0 has the least possible direct interaction with the qubes in order to minimize the possibility of an attack originating from there.

Updates to the dom0 operating system and the included Template OS images are performed via a special mechanism which does not require dom0 operating system to connect directly to a network.

=== The User domains: qubes ===
An app qube (an instance of a qube) provides secure, compartmentalized execution of standard user applications such as a web browser, an email client or a text editor.

Operation of app qubes is controlled by the Qube Manager. It launches the discrete app qubes and presents their applications on the desktop of dom0 as normal process windows.

This mechanism follows the idea of a sandbox. After running the application, viewing the document, etc., the whole disposable will be destroyed on shutdown.

Qubes OS integrates all of the app qubes into a single common desktop environment. The identity of each app qube for a given process is provided by an unforgeable, colored window border which is defined in the properties of the app qube.

Disk usage in dom0 is minimized by allowing multiple app qubes to share a common "template" root file system image maintained in read-only mode. Additional disk storage is only used for userʼs applications, data and per-VM settings.

=== Network domain ===
The network mechanism is the most exposed to security attacks. To circumvent this, it is isolated in a separate, unprivileged qube, named the net qube.

Another firewall Domain is used to house the Linux-kernel-based firewall, so that even if the network domain is compromised, the firewall is still isolated and protected (as it is running in a separate Linux kernel in a separate VM).

== Reception ==
Security and privacy experts such as Edward Snowden, Daniel J. Bernstein, and Christopher Soghoian have publicly praised the project.

Jesse Smith wrote a review of Qubes OS 3.1 for DistroWatch Weekly:

I had a revelation though on the second day of my trial when I realized I had been using Qubes incorrectly. I had been treating Qubes as a security enhanced Linux distribution, as though it were a regular desktop operating system with some added security. This quickly frustrated me as it was difficult to share files between domains, take screen shots or even access the Internet from programs I had opened in Domain Zero. My experience was greatly improved when I started thinking of Qubes as being multiple, separate computers which all just happened to share a display screen. Once I began to look at each domain as its own island, cut off from all the others, Qubes made a lot more sense. Qubes brings domains together on one desktop in much the same way virtualization lets us run multiple operating systems on the same server.

Kyle Rankin from Linux Journal reviewed Qubes OS in 2016:

I'm sure you already can see a number of areas where Qubes provides greater security than you would find in a regular Linux desktop.

In 2014, Qubes was selected as a finalist of Access Innovation Prize 2014 for Endpoint Security, run by the international human rights organization Access Now.

== See also ==
- Hyperjacking
- Whonix
- List of security-focused operating systems
