= List of security-focused operating systems =

This is a list of operating systems specifically focused on security. Similar concepts include security-evaluated operating systems that have achieved certification from an auditing organization, and trusted operating systems that provide sufficient support for multilevel security and evidence of correctness to meet a particular set of requirements.

== Linux ==
=== Android-based ===
- GrapheneOS is a security-focused, Android-based mobile OS that uses a hardened kernel, C library, custom memory allocator (hardened_malloc), and a hardened Chromium-based browser named Vanadium. It also offers privacy/security features, such as Duress PIN/Password or disabling the USB-C port at a driver/hardware level to avoid exploitation. It deploys exploit mitigations such as hardware-based memory tagging, secure app spawning, restricted dynamic code loading, and more.

=== Debian-based ===
- Linux Kodachi is a security-focused operating system.
- Tails is aimed at preserving privacy and anonymity.
- KickSecure is a security-focused Linux distribution that aims to be "hardened by default". It uses network hardening, kernel hardening, Strong Linux User Account Isolation, better randomness, root access restrictions, and app-specific hardening.
- Whonix is an anonymity focused operating system based on KickSecure. It consists of two virtual machines, And all communications are routed through Tor.

=== Other Linux distributions ===
- Alpine Linux is designed to be small, simple, and secure. It uses musl, BusyBox, and OpenRC instead of the more commonly used glibc, GNU Core Utilities, and systemd.
- Owl - Openwall GNU/Linux, a security-enhanced Linux distribution for servers.
- Secureblue, a Fedora Atomic based distro that uses a hardened kernel, custom memory allocator (hardened_malloc), Trivalent, a security-focused, Chromium-based browser inspired by Vanadium, and many other exploit mitigations.

== BSD ==
- OpenBSD is a Unix-like operating system that emphasizes portability, standardization, correctness, proactive security, and integrated cryptography.

== Xen ==
- Qubes OS aims to provide security through isolation. Isolation is provided through the use of virtualization technology. This allows the segmentation of applications into secure virtual machines.

== See also ==
- Computer security
- Comparison of operating systems
- Comparison of mobile operating systems
- Security engineering
