= IBM System 9000 =

Early 1980s laboratory computer from IBM

IBM System 9000 series
- Also known as: CS-9000, CS/9000, or CS9000
- Manufacturer: IBM
- Released: 1982
- Discontinued: 1986

The System 9000 (S9000) is a family of microcomputers from IBM consisting of the System 9001, 9002, and 9003. The first member of the family, the System 9001 laboratory computer, was introduced in May 1982 as the IBM Instruments Computer System Model 9000. It was renamed to the System 9001 in 1984 when the System 9000 family name and the System 9002 multi-user general-purpose business computer was introduced. The last member of the family, the System 9003 industrial computer, was introduced in 1985. All members of the System 9000 family did not find much commercial success and the entire family was discontinued on 2 December 1986. The System 9000 was based around the Motorola 68000 microprocessor and the Motorola VERSAbus system bus. All members had the IBM CSOS real-time operating system (OS) stored on read-only memory; and the System 9002 could also run the multi-user Microsoft Xenix OS, which was suitable for business use and supported up to four users.

== Features ==
There were three versions of the System 9000. The 9001 was the benchtop (lab) model, the 9002 was the desktop model without laboratory-specific features, and the 9003 was a manufacturing and process control version modified to be suitable for factory environments. The System 9002 and 9003 were based on the System 9001, which was based on around an 8 MHz Motorola 68000, and the Motorola VERSAbus system bus (the System 9000 was one of the few that used the VERSAbus). Input/output ports included three RS-232C serial ports, an IEEE-488 instrument port, and a bidirectional 8-bit parallel port. For laboratory data acquisition, analog-to-digital converters that could be attached to its I/O ports were available. User input could be via a user-definable 10-key touch panel on the integrated CRT display, a 57-key user-definable keypad, or a 83-key Model F keyboard. The touch panel and keypad were designed for controlling experiments.

All System 9000 members had an IBM real-time operating system called CSOS (Computer System Operating System) on 128 KB of read-only memory (ROM). This was a multi-tasking operating system that could be extended by loading components from disk. IBM also offered Microsoft Xenix on the System 9002, but this required at least 640 KB of main memory and a VERSAbus card containing a memory management unit. The machines shipped with 128 KB of main memory as standard, and up to 5 MB could be added to the system using memory boards that plugged into the VERSAbus. Each board could contain up to 1 MB, which were installed in 256 KB increments.

== History ==
The System 9000 was developed by IBM Instruments, Inc., an IBM subsidiary established in 1980 that focused on selling scientific and technical instruments as well as the computer equipment designed to control, log, or process these instruments. It was originally introduced as the IBM Instruments Computer System Model 9000 in May 1982. Its long name led to it being referred to as the Computer System 9000, CS-9000, CS/9000, or CS9000. Originally, the CS9000 was available for scientific instrument users, it was not offered to customers who wanted to use it for other purposes. The CS9000 was unsuccessful in this niche; the cheaper IBM Personal Computer was adequate for many instrumentation tasks, and IBM's larger general-purpose computers were used for more demanding tasks.

In 1983 IBM began encouraging value-added resellers to sell the CS9000 as an alternative to large computers like DEC Professional and Honeywell Level 6. IBM formally repositioned the CS9000 on February 21, 1984 as a family of computers, renaming it to the System 9000, which consisted of the System 9001 and 9002. The 9001 was a renamed CS9000, which retained its focus on the instrumentation market, while the 9002 was a general-purpose business computer that ran the IBM CSOS or Microsoft Xenix operating systems and supported one to four users. The 9002 was unsuccessful in the business market, due to the lack of business application software support from software developers other than IBM. IBM finally introduced a new model, the System 9003, in April 1985 as a computer-aided manufacturing computer, but it was also unsuccessful. As a result, manufacturing of the System 9000 family was stopped in January 1986, and it remained in limited availability until it was discontinued on 2 December 1986. Reasons cited for the failure of the System 9000 were its poor performance and high price, which led to the IBM PC being used where price was of concern, and to other 32-bit microcomputers being used where performance mattered. IBM closed its Instrument division in January 1987, reassigning the approximately 150 employees that had worked for it to other positions.

== Reception ==
Noting the obscurity of its 1982 release, BYTE in January 1983 called the System 9000 "IBM's 'Secret' Computer" and stated that it was "in its quiet way, one of the most exciting new arrivals on today's microcomputer scene". The magazine speculated that with some changes it would be "a natural candidate for a business or general-purpose computer". A later review by a member of Brandeis University's chemistry department criticized several aspects of the hardware and software, but praised the sophisticated BASIC and IBM's customer service. The reviewer concluded that "the CS-9000 is a very fast and powerful laboratory computer [that is] very affordable".

== IBM 9000 ==
At least some ads by dealers in 1983 referred to "The IBM 9000: Multi-User Micro," although the name "IBM Computer System 9000" was also advertised.

IBM also sometimes referred to the System 9000 as "IBM 9000" in their own marketing, at least when referring to their C compiler for the system.
