= Unix Expo =

Unix trade show in NY, NY, US (1984–1996)

- Status: Inactive
- Genre: Technology conference and trade show
- Venue: Sheraton Centre Hotel; Javits Center
- Location: New York City
- Country: United States
- Inaugurated: 1984
- Most recent: 1996
- Attendance: 35,000 at peak (early 1990s)
- Organizer: Blenheim Group

Unix Expo was a conference and trade show that focused on the Unix operating system, and software based on Unix, in the information technology sector. It ran from 1984 through 1996 and was held in New York City during the autumn season. The show was owned and managed by the Blenheim Group.

== Origins ==
The first Unix Expo was held in October 1984 and was split between the Sheraton Centre Hotel and the Marina Expo complex in New York and had the formal title of Unix Operating System Exposition & Conference. It was organized by the Unigroup users' group for Unix, and some seventy Unix-related vendors signed up to display at it.

== The shows ==
AT&T Corporation, owner of Bell Labs, the creator of Unix, was the company behind the early commercial push for Unix adoption; accordingly it had the anchor display position in early shows. By 1987, in its fourth year, the show had some 16,000 attendees, with commercial interest rising in Unix due to its portability and strengths in development tools and networking. Due to acquisitions of various promotions firms, the show was run under the names of several different companies, ending with the Blenheim Group.

The show grew in significance; in 1985 it was where AT&T unveiled Xenix System V, and in 1989 it was the site of AT&T's unveiling of the much-talked-about System V Release 4 version of Unix. Similarly, it was a site where discussions to end the divisive Unix wars could take place. Numerous other product announcements and company alliances were also announced during a Unix Expo.

In its peak years, the show was held within the Javits Center and had upwards of 35,000 attendees. Along with Uniforum in San Francisco in the spring, Unix Expo was considered one of the two big Unix-themed trade shows and conferences that one could attend during a year. The show featured keynote addresses by the likes of Oracle Corporation head Larry Ellison, O'Reilly Media founder Tim O'Reilly, the Santa Cruz Operation CEO Alok Mohan, and Sun Microsystems president Ed Zander. It also featured panel discussions, technology- and business-oriented breakout sessions, and floor space for exhibiting vendors such as the aforementioned companies as well as DEC, HP, IBM, Novell, and numerous others.

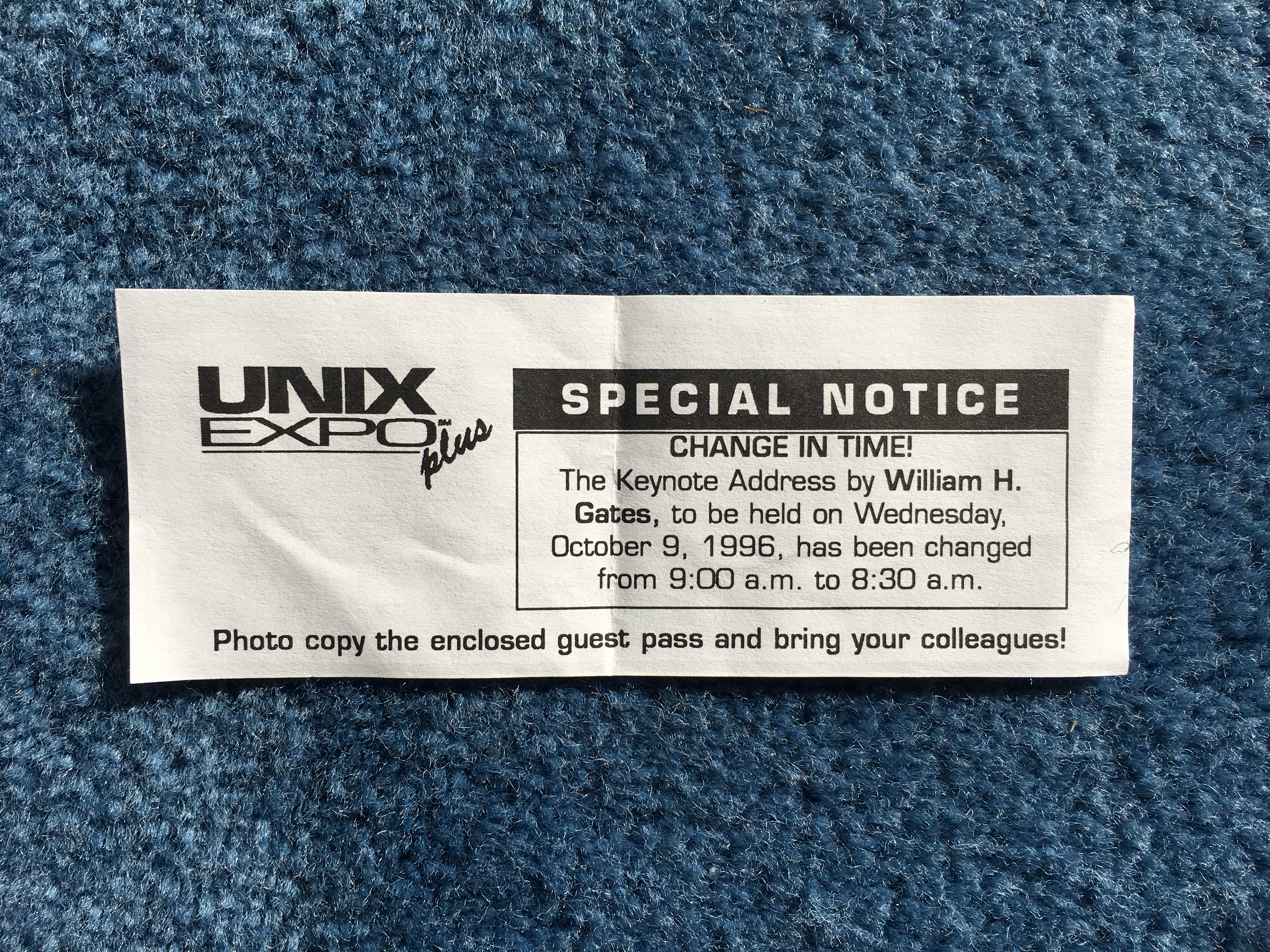
The Bill Gates keynote was much anticipated

Two well-known industry CEOs not normally associated with Unix gave keynotes at Unix Expo: Steve Jobs in 1991, when he was head of NeXT (whose innovative NeXTSTEP operating system was built on top of Unix) in between stints at Apple Computer, and Bill Gates in 1996, when he was running Microsoft.

The latter appearance was much anticipated, as Microsoft's Windows NT server operating system product was the major rival of Unix and Gates was often seen as an industry villain. As industry chronicle Computerworld headlined a story to portray it: "Gates to step into pro-Unix lion's den." while Computer Reseller News said that Gates was taking "the Windows NT battle right into the belly of the beast at Unix Expo". In a large presentation area filled to capacity, Gates gave a message centered around the notion that Windows NT and Unix were not as far apart as one might think. But the rivalry was still manifest. During the keynote Gates oversaw a staffer running a demo of a beta version of the Microsoft Internet Explorer browser running on the Unix-based Sun Solaris operating system. And as SunWorld magazine reported, "to the delight of the crowd, it crashed the first time around."

== End ==
As it happened, 1996 was to be the last Unix Expo. During the final two years of its run, vendor participation and attendee numbers had both declined. This was attributable to Unix having become a well-established technology that had found widespread acceptance and a level of maturity; as such, it was no longer the sort of leading-edge technology that tended to warrant a demand for dedicated trade shows and conferences. That role was beginning to be taken on by the Linux operating system, which had had some small exhibits within Unix Expo and now was attracting more industry interest as a leading-edge development.

Accordingly, in 1997 Unix Expo ceased to be its own entity and was folded into a new larger and more general show called IT Forum '97 and run by Miller Freeman.
