= Addamax =

American software company, 1986–1999

- Industry: Software
- Founded: January 13, 1986
- Founder: Peter A. Alsberg
- Defunct: June 1, 1999
- Headquarters: Champaign, Illinois

Addamax was an American software company that developed trusted operating systems based on UNIX System V and Berkeley Software Distribution (BSD) variants of Unix. Founded in 1986 in Champaign, Illinois, the company is best known for filing a high-profile antitrust lawsuit in 1991 against the Open Software Foundation (OSF). The company was dissolved in 1999.

== History ==
Addamax was founded on January 13, 1986 in Champaign, Illinois by Peter A. Alsberg, with a sales and development office in Gaithersburg, Maryland. The company focused on developing trusted, security-enhanced variants of Unix — operating systems built to meet government and military security classification standards.

In 1991, Addamax filed a antitrust lawsuit against the Open Software Foundation, Digital Equipment Corporation and Hewlett-Packard, alleging that OSF had created a cartel controlling the Unix operating system market and engaged in monopsony price fixing that forced the company out of business. The case reached the US Court of Appeals for the First Circuit, which ruled on the matter in 1998. The company was dissolved on June 1, 1999.
