= SecureWare =

SecureWare Inc., founded in 1986 developed software and encryption technology for securing Unix-based operating systems. Its secure operating system was used to help secure the world's first internet bank, Security First Network Bank (S1 Technologies). SecureWare also worked closely with HP's federal division to develop security products, such as the trusted operating system, used by the U.S. Department of Defense for certain military information.

In 1996, SecureWare's internet system security division was sold to Hewlett Packard. The rest of SecureWare was acquired by Security First Network Bank later that same year.
