= Security-evaluated operating system =

Operating system that achieved security certification

In computing, security-evaluated operating systems have achieved certification from an external security-auditing organization, the most popular evaluations are Common Criteria (CC) and FIPS 140-2.

== Oracle Solaris ==
Trusted Solaris 8 was a security-focused version of the Solaris Unix operating system. Aimed primarily at the government computing sector, Trusted Solaris adds detailed auditing of all tasks, pluggable authentication, mandatory access control, additional physical authentication devices, and fine-grained access control(FGAC). Versions of Trusted Solaris through version 8 are Common Criteria certified.

Trusted Solaris Version 8 received the EAL 4 certification level augmented by a number of protection profiles. (Note: See 6 Evaluation assurance levels for explanation of The Evaluation Assurance Levels.)

== BAE Systems' STOP ==
BAE Systems' STOP version 6.0.E received an EAL4+ in April 2004 and the 6.1.E version received an EAL5+ certification in March 2005. STOP version 6.4 U4 received an EAL5+ certification in July 2008. Versions of STOP prior to STOP 6 have held B3 certifications under TCSEC. While STOP 6 is binary compatible with Linux, it does not derive from the Linux kernel. See for an overview of the system.

== Red Hat Enterprise Linux ==
Red Hat Enterprise Linux Version 7.1 achieved EAL4+ in October 2016.

Red Hat Enterprise Linux Version 6.2 on 32 bit x86 Architecture achieved EAL4+ in December 2014. Red Hat Enterprise Linux Version 6.2 with KVM Virtualization for x86 Architectures achieved EAL4+ in October 2012.

Red Hat Enterprise Linux 5 achieved EAL4+ in June 2007.

== Novell SUSE Linux Enterprise Server ==
Novell's SUSE Linux Enterprise Server 15 is certified for IBM Z, Arm and x86-64 at CAPP/EAL4+ in August 2021. See.

Novell's SUSE Linux Enterprise Server 9 running on an IBM eServer was certified at CAPP/EAL4+ in February 2005. See News release at heise.de.

== Microsoft Windows ==
The following versions of Microsoft Windows have received EAL 4 Augmented ALC_FLR.3 certification:

- Windows 2008 Server (64-bit), Enterprise (64-bit) and Datacenter, as well as Windows Vista Enterprise (both 32-bit and 64-bit) attained EAL 4 Augmented (colloquially referred to as EAL 4+) ALC_FLR.3 status in 2009.
- Windows 2000 Server, Advanced Server, and Professional, each with Service Pack 3 and Q326886 Hotfix operating on the x86 platform were certified as CAPP/EAL 4 Augmented ALC_FLR.3 in October 2002. (This includes standard configurations as Domain Controller, Server in a Domain, Stand-alone Server, Workstation in a Domain, Stand-alone Workstation)
- Windows XP Professional and Embedded editions, with Service Pack 2, and Windows Server 2003 Standard and Enterprise editions (32-bit and 64-bit), with Service Pack 1, were all certified in December 2005.

== Mac OS X ==
Apple's Mac OS X and Mac OS X Server running 10.3.6 both with the Common Criteria Tools Package installed were certified at CAPP/EAL3 in January 2005.

Apple's Mac OS X & Mac OS X Server running the latest version 10.4.6 have not yet been fully evaluated however the Common Criteria Tools package is available.

== iOS or iPadOS ==
The iPhone and iPad are authorized to be used for NATO Restricted clearance systems. Does not require additional software to be installed, they operate securely when orchestrated by a device management service.

== GEMSOS ==
Some versions of Gemini Multiprocessing Secure Operating System were qualified as a TCSEC A1 system. GEMSOS runs on x86 processor type COTS hardware.

== OpenVMS and SEVMS ==
The SEVMS enhancement to VMS was a CC B1/B3 system formerly of Digital Equipment Corporation (DEC). A standard OpenVMS installation is rated as CC C2.

== Green Hills INTEGRITY-178B ==
Green Hills Software's INTEGRITY-178B real-time operating system was certified at Common Criteria EAL6+ in September 2008, running on an embedded PowerPC processor on a Compact PCI card.

== Unisys MCP ==
The Unisys MCP operating system includes an implementation of the DoD Orange Book C2 specification, the controlled access protection sub-level of discretionary protection. MCP/AS obtained the C2 rating in August, 1987.

== Unisys OS 2200 ==
The Unisys OS 2200 operating system includes an implementation of the DoD Orange Book B1, Labeled security protection level specification. OS 2200 first obtained a successful B1 evaluation in September, 1989. Unisys maintained that evaluation until 1994 through the National Computer Security Center Rating Maintenance Phase (RAMP) of the Trusted Product Evaluation Program.

== See also ==
- Comparison of operating systems
- Security-focused operating system
- Trusted operating system
