= Xenix =

Microsoft Unix operating system

- Xenix System V R2.3.2 (1989) running in the emulator Bochs
- Developer: Microsoft, SCO, HCR, Logica
- OS family: SVR2.3, BSD
- Working state: Historic
- Source model: Closed source
- Initial release: August 25, 1980; 46 years ago
- Latest release: System V R2.3.4 / August 12, 1991; 35 years ago
- Supported platforms: PC/XT, x86, PDP-11, Z8001, 68k
- Kernel type: Monolithic kernel
- Default user interface: Command-line interface
- License: Proprietary
- Succeeded by: SCO UNIX (OpenServer 5)

Xenix is a Unix operating system that was published by Microsoft from 1980 to 1987, and by the Santa Cruz Operation (SCO) from 1987 to 1991. Xenix is based on the operating system UNIX System V, which Microsoft licensed from AT&T Corporation in the late 1970s. UNIX System V ran on the PDP-11 minicomputer. Microsoft ported the source code so the operating system could run on certain 16-bit processors in the Intel x86 family. After some additional modifications, Microsoft published Xenix in 1980.

One consequence of the breakup of the Bell System in the late 1970s was that AT&T started marketing UNIX themselves in the early 1980s. Not wishing to compete with AT&T in the UNIX market, Microsoft abandoned development of Xenix shortly thereafter, but continued to market the product. In 1987, SCO (a company in which Microsoft had a partial stake) made a deal with Microsoft to acquire the exclusive rights to Xenix. At that time, Xenix was the most widely deployed commercial UNIX operating system.

SCO resumed development of Xenix, and continued to release new versions of it until 1991. In the interim, they developed their own System V variant for Intel i386 processors, SCO UNIX, and released it in 1989.

== History ==
Bell Labs, the developer of Unix, was part of the regulated Bell System and could not sell Unix directly to most end users (academic and research institutions excepted); it could, however, sell it to software vendors who would then resell it to end users (or their own resellers), combined with their own added features. Microsoft, which expected that Unix would be its operating system of the future when personal computers became powerful enough, purchased a license for Version 7 Unix from AT&T in 1978, and announced on August 25, 1980, that it would make the software available for the 16-bit microcomputer market. Because Microsoft was not able to license the "Unix" name itself, the company gave it an original name.

While "MS-DOS will become the premier single-user operating system", said Microsoft cofounder Paul Allen, his company "hopes that Xenix will become the preferred choice for software production and exchange", it stated in 1981. MS-DOS was Microsoft's "single-user, single-tasking operating system", which can run from floppy disks. Xenix, Allen said, "really should be used with a hard disk". MS-DOS and Xenix are "part of a family ... with a clear migration path", he added, promising binary compatibility of Xenix-compiled C software with MS-DOS, and interoperability of Xenix-based file servers and MS-DOS application servers. The company advised customers who wanted multiuser or multitasking support to buy Xenix.

Microsoft expected that MS-DOS would become almost indistinguishable from single-user Xenix, or XEDOS, which would also run on the 68000, Z8000, and LSI-11; they would be upwardly compatible with Xenix, which Byte in 1983 described as "the multi-user MS-DOS of the future". Microsoft's Chris Larson described MS-DOS 2.0's Xenix compatibility as "the second most important feature". His company advertised DOS and Xenix together, describing MS-DOS 2.0 (its "single-user OS") as sharing features and system calls with Xenix ("the multi-user, multi-tasking, Unix-derived operating system"), and promising easy porting between them.

Microsoft called Xenix "a universal operating environment". It did not sell Xenix directly to end users, but licensed the software to OEMs. Microsoft received $500 for each single-user copy sold by companies such as IBM, Intel, Management Systems Development, Tandy, Altos Computer, SCO, and Siemens (SINIX) which then ported it to their own proprietary computer architectures.

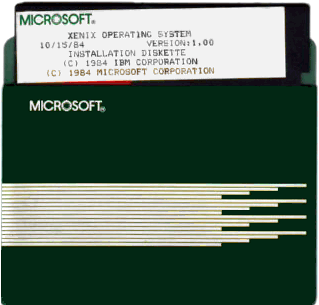
IBM/Microsoft Xenix 1.00 on 5¼-inch floppy disk

In 1981, Microsoft said the first version of Xenix was "very close to the original Unix version 7 source" on the PDP-11, and later versions were to incorporate its own fixes and improvements. The company stated that it intended to port the operating system to the Zilog Z8000 series, Digital LSI-11, Intel 8086 and 80286, Motorola 68000, and possibly "numerous other processors", and provide Microsoft's "full line of system software products", including BASIC and other languages. The first port was for the Z8001 16-bit processor: the first customer ship was January 1981 for Central Data Corporation of Illinois, followed in March 1981 by Paradyne Corporation's Z8001 product. The first 8086 port was for the Altos Computer Systems' non-PC-compatible 8600-series computers (first customer ship date Q1 1982). (Note: The Altos 8086 machines had a custom MMU, which used 4K pages.)

Intel sold complete computers with Xenix under their Intel System 86 brand (with specific models such as 86/330 or 86/380X); they also offered the individual boards that made these computers under their iSBC brand. This included processor boards like iSBC 86/12 and also MMU boards such as the iSBC 309. The first Intel Xenix systems shipped in July 1982. (Note: Intel also offered their own iRMX operating system as an alternative for these.) Tandy more than doubled the Xenix installed base when it made TRS-Xenix the default operating system for its TRS-80 Model 16 68000-based computer in early 1983, and was the largest Unix vendor in 1984. Seattle Computer Products also made (PC-incompatible) 8086 computers bundled with Xenix, like their Gazelle II, which used the S-100 bus and was available in late 1983 or early 1984. There was also a port for IBM System 9000.

SCO had initially worked on its own PDP-11 port of V7, called Dynix, (Note: Unrelated to the later Dynix from Sequent Computer Systems) but then struck an agreement with Microsoft for joint development and technology exchange on Xenix in 1982. Microsoft and SCO then further engaged Human Computing Resources Corporation (HCR) in Canada, and a software products group within Logica plc in the United Kingdom, as part of making further improvements to Xenix and porting Xenix to other platforms. In doing so, Microsoft gave HCR and Logica the rights to do Xenix ports and to license Xenix binary distributions in those territories.

In 1984, a port to the 68000-based Apple Lisa 2 was jointly developed by SCO and Microsoft and it was the first shrink-wrapped binary product sold by SCO. The Multiplan spreadsheet was released for it.

In its 1983 OEM directory, Microsoft said the difficulty in porting to the various 8086 and Z8000-based machines had been the lack of a standardized memory management unit and protection facilities. Hardware manufacturers compensated by designing their own hardware, but the ensuing complexity made it "extremely difficult if not impossible for the very small manufacturer to develop a computer capable of supporting a system such as Xenix from scratch," and "the Xenix kernel must be custom-tailored to each new hardware environment".

A generally available port to the unmapped Intel 8086/8088 architecture was done by The Santa Cruz Operation around 1983. SCO Xenix for the PC XT shipped in 1984 and contained some enhancement from 4.2BSD; it also supported the Micnet local area networking.

While Unix was still rare in companies during the second half of the 1980s, Xenix was probably the most commonly installed Unix. The 286 version of Xenix used the integrated MMU present on this chip, by running in 286 protected mode. The 286 Xenix was accompanied by new hardware from Xenix OEMs. For example, the Sperry PC/IT, an IBM PC AT clone, was advertised as capable of supporting eight simultaneous dumb terminal users under this version.

While Xenix 2.0 was still based on Version 7 Unix, version 3.0 was upgraded to a Unix System III code base, a 1984 Intel manual for Xenix 286 noted that the Xenix kernel had about 10,000 lines at this time. It was followed by a System V R2 codebase in Xenix 5.0 (a.k.a. Xenix System V).

=== Transfer of ownership to SCO ===
After the breakup of the Bell System in 1984, AT&T started selling System V. Microsoft, believing that it could not compete with Unix's developer, decided to abandon Xenix. The decision was not immediately transparent, which led to the term vaporware. Although Gates in November 1985 wrote "In the next 18 months, there is a good chance that Xenix system installations will be able to surpass the 400,000 system mark and achieve critical mass", he said that MS-DOS and Xenix "are separate products that address different markets" and "Microsoft does not intend to merge them into one OS"; in particular, "Multi-user capability will never be a feature of MS-DOS". His company agreed with IBM to develop OS/2, and its Xenix team (together with the best MS-DOS developers) was assigned to that project. In 1987, Microsoft transferred ownership of Xenix to SCO in an agreement that left Microsoft owning slightly less than 20% of SCO (this amount prevented both companies from having to disclose the exact amount in the event of an SCO IPO). SCO would acquire both of the other companies that had Xenix rights, Logica's software products group in 1986 and HCR in 1990. When Microsoft eventually lost interest in OS/2 as well, the company based its further high-end strategy on Windows NT.

In 1987, SCO ported Xenix to the 386 processor, a 32-bit chip, after securing knowledge from Microsoft insiders that Microsoft was no longer developing Xenix. Xenix System V Release 2.3.1 introduced support for i386, SCSI and TCP/IP. SCO's Xenix System V/386 was the first 32-bit operating system available on the market for the x86 CPU architecture.

Microsoft continued to use Xenix internally. As of 1987 Xenix handled 60,000 megabytes of email weekly on its MS-Net network. The company submitted a patch to support functionality in Unix to AT&T that year, which trickled down to the code base of both Xenix and SCO Unix. Microsoft is said to have used Xenix on Sun workstations and VAX minicomputers extensively within their company as late as 1988. All internal Microsoft email transport was done on Xenix-based 386/486 systems until 1996, when the company moved to its own Exchange Server product. Microsoft chairman Bill Gates said at Unix Expo in 1996 that, for a long time, Microsoft had the highest-volume AT&T Unix license.

=== Replacement ===
By 1988 AT&T reported that Xenix developers were about half of the 500,000 Unix licenses worldwide. SCO released its SCO Unix as a higher-end product, based on System V R3 and offering a number of technical advances over Xenix; Xenix remained in the product line. In the meantime, AT&T and Sun Microsystems completed the merge of Xenix, BSD, SunOS and System V R3 into System V R4. The last version of SCO Xenix/386 itself was System V R2.3.4, released in 1991.

== Features ==
Aside from its AT&T Unix base, Xenix incorporated elements from BSD, notably the vi text editor and its supporting libraries (termcap and curses). Its kernel featured some original extensions by Microsoft, notably file locking and semaphores, while to the userland Microsoft added a "visual shell" for menu-driven operation instead of the traditional UNIX shell. A limited form of local networking over serial lines (RS-232 ports) was possible through the "micnet" software, which supported file transfer and electronic mail, although UUCP was still used for networking via modems.

OEMs often added further modifications to the Xenix system.

== Trusted Xenix ==
Trusted Xenix was a variant initially developed by IBM, under the name Secure XENIX; later versions, under the Trusted Xenix name, were developed by Trusted Information Systems. It incorporated the Bell–LaPadula model of multilevel security, and had a multilevel secure interface for the STU-III secure communications device (that is, an STU-III connection would be made available only to those applications running at the same privilege level as the key loaded in the STU-III). It was evaluated by formal methods and achieved a B2 security rating under the DoD's Trusted Computer System Evaluation Criteria (examples of A1-class systems are Honeywell's SCOMP, Aesec's GEMSOS, and Boeing's SNS Server). Version 2.0 was released in January 1991, version 3.0 in April 1992, and version 4.0 in September 1993. It was still in use as late as 1995.

== See also ==
- AT&T 6300 Plus
- Concurrent DOS
- PC/IX
- Venix
