= Whonix =

Anonymous operating system

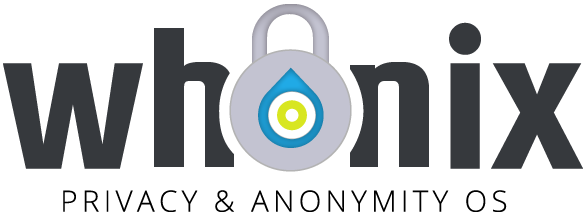

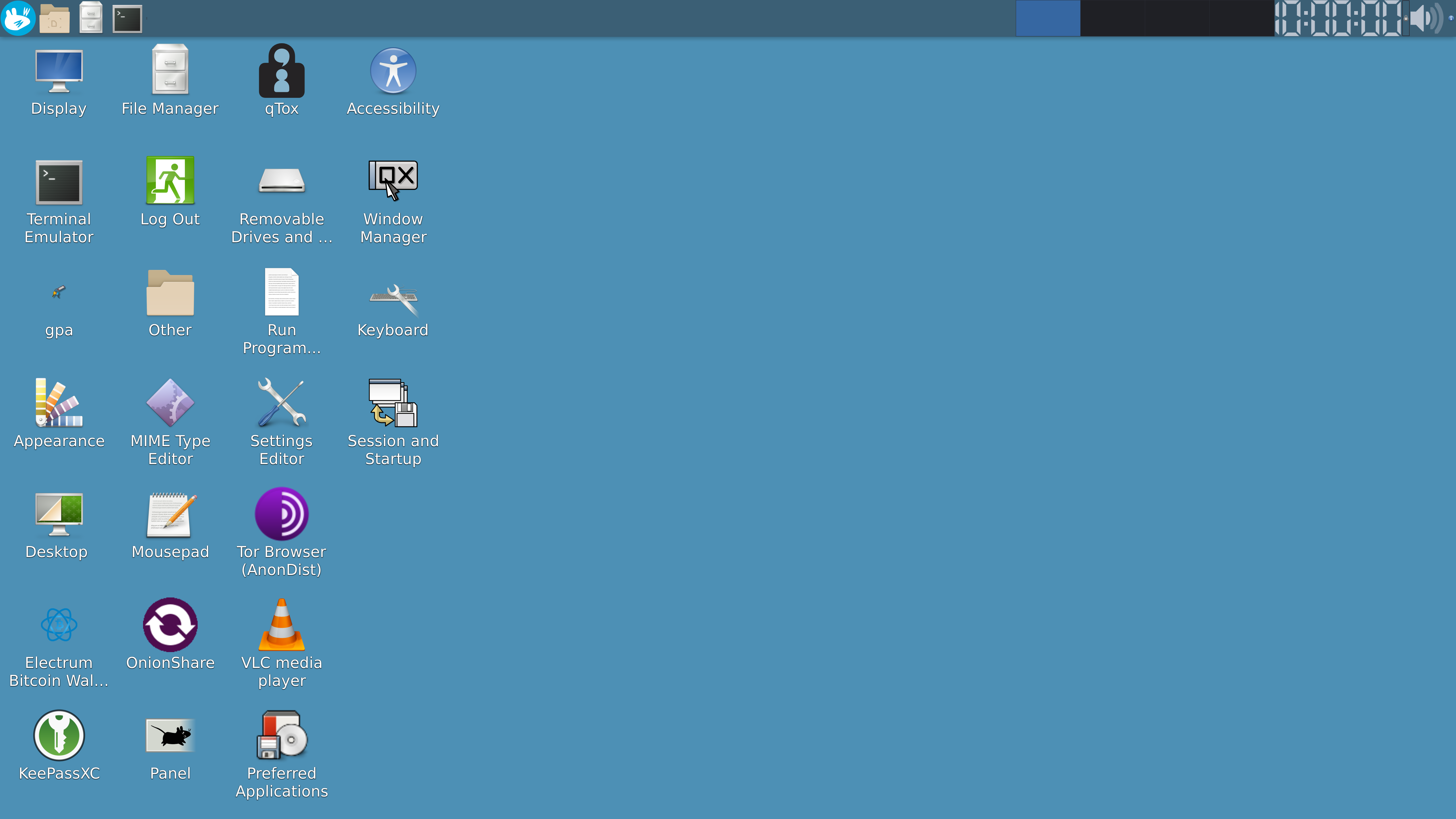
- Developer: Whonix Developers
- OS family: Linux (Unix-like)
- Working state: Active
- Source model: Open source
- Initial release: 29 February 2012; 14 years ago
- Latest release: 18.2.4.2 / 24 October 2026; 24 days ago
- Repository: https://gitlab.com/whonix
- Marketing target: Personal Computing, Servers (onion service hosting)
- Supported platforms: x86, arm64 (RPi 3)
- Kernel type: Monolithic (Linux)
- License: Mainly the GNU GPL v3 and various other free software licenses
- Official website: www.whonix.org; dds6qkxpwdeubwucdiaord2xgbbeyds25rbsgr73tbfpqpt4a6vjwsyd.onion ^{(Accessing link help)}

Whonix (/huːnɪks/, HOO-niks) is an anonymity focused Linux distribution based on Kicksecure.

The operating system consists of two virtual machines, a workstation and a Tor gateway running Debian.

== History ==
=== TorBOX (February – July 2012) ===
The initial concept was announced by Patrick Schleizer under the pseudonym Proper, and later changed to Adrelanos in 2012 before revealing his identity in 2014. His idea was to leverage a virtual machine acting as a transparent proxy to route all Internet traffic through the Tor network. This would have allowed one to mask one's IP address, prevent DNS leaks and avoid having to configure proxy settings for individual applications (or ones who do not support them).

TorBOX was at its beginning only a guide released on the Tor Project website, which also provided some shell scripts. Other contributors provided more information as TorBOX became more popular.

As the project's complexity grew, leak tests became increasingly necessary. Some contributors developed utilities to automate many steps and improve user-friendliness. Nonetheless, maintaining the build instructions for TorBOX while simultaneously updating the shell scripts became too much of a burden for the developers, who decided to drop the manual creation instructions, migrating them and focusing exclusively on the shell scripts.

Even then, complexity was still growing due to additional features or changes in line with security research. On March 25, 2012, with the release of TorBOX's 0.1.3, the programmers agreed to completely automate the build process and improve codability with a change in the development process, brought by a new website with better capabilities than the old project's wiki.

The TorBOX/aos wiki listed seven released versions. With the advent of the third release, Patrick Schleizer, acting under his pseudonym Proper, released his GPG public-key containing his contact information,

The sixth version saw the first rename of the developer Proper to Adrelanos. However, the former username was maintained on the Tor Website until the seventh and final version.

Development of TorBOX continued until version 0.2.1, released July 16, 2012. The project was renamed the following day.

=== Whonix (September 2012 – present) ===
Adrelanos posted a request for suggestions on the tor-talk mailing list. His original idea was a name which would have made the purpose of the anonymous operating system clear and at the same time avoided confusion or trademark issues. Nick Mathewson, Tor Project's co-founder, debated the idea of having a self-explanatory name, stating that Tor was "doing okay" even without having a particularly descriptive name.

While many suggestions were sent, Adrelanos concluded the post announcing the new name, Whonix, and publishing a signed message with his final decision on the project's website. He reasoned that the name was unused and would have provided more results in search engines. Whonix is a compound of two words: who ("what person/s") and nix (a German word that means "nothing").

Whonix 0.3.0, never released, was based on Ubuntu. While Ubuntu was praised from a technical perspective, potential trademark issues would have complicated the distribution along the potential revocation of the license from Canonical. Complying with the terms requested by a rebranding would have required work which was beyond the capability of the Whonix developers. Moreover, the release of Ubuntu 12.10 was heavily criticized for the closer integration with the Amazon ecosystem and other privacy issues.

The Whonix project recognized the privacy issues which would have caused a problem with the use of Ubuntu, and recommended against using it even on the host machine.

The first release under the new name of Whonix happened with version 0.4.4, the first one since TorBOX 0.2.1. It was rebased on Debian, which is described by the project as being "a good compromise of security and usability".

The second release, Whonix 0.4.5 was the first to be announced by adrelanos on the tor-talk mailing list.

== Porting to Qubes OS ==
In August 2014, a user called WhonixQubes announced on the qubes-users mailing list the first successful integration of Qubes OS version R2-rc2 and Whonix 8.2. Joanna Rutkowska, founder of Qubes OS, publicly stated her praise about the efforts.

In June 2015, Rutkowska announced the reception of funding from the Open Technology Fund to further sponsor the porting work of Whonix to Qubes OS. The proposal to OTF was made initially in September 2014, after Rutkowska was approached by Michael Carbone, an employee of Access Now and member of the Qubes OS team who helped with the process.

At the same time, Patrick Schleizer wrote about wanting to personally focus on the development of Qubes-Whonix.

With the release of Qubes OS R3.0 in October 2015, Whonix templates officially became available.

== Relationship with the Tor Project ==
In August 2020, the Tor Project announced on their edited blog post stating that they can no longer endorse Whonix due to their concerns with patterns of "tolerance for sexism, racism, and other bigotry within the Whonix community" and discouraged the users from getting involved with them.. Apparently, the reason was that the Whonix project had an official account on Gab, and there was a link in Whonix's website linking to Whonix's account on Gab.

== See also ==
- Tails (operating system)
- Qubes OS
- Linux Kodachi
