= Stephen L. Norris =

American businessman

Stephen L. Norris is an American businessman, investor, and financier. He was one of the co-founders of The Carlyle Group, an American private equity firm. He was later owner and founder of Stephen Norris Capital Partners and the chairman of Gulf Capital Partners.

== Education ==
Norris received a BS (1972) and a JD (1975) from the University of Alabama. He received an LLM from New York University (1976).

== Career ==
=== Marriott ===
Norris's early career was spent at Marriott Corporation, where as a tax and mergers and acquisitions specialist he became a corporate vice president. He was a principal strategist and advisor for Marriott's public and private financings, limited partnerships, acquisitions, and divestitures from 1981 to mid-1987.

=== Carlyle Group ===
In October 1987, Norris co-founded the private-equity firm The Carlyle Group with four other Washington DC executives: David M. Rubenstein, William E. Conway, Jr., Daniel A. D'Aniello, and Greg Rosenbaum.

At Carlyle, Norris was particularly connected to the Arab states of the Persian Gulf; for instance in 1991 he helped arrange a $590 million investment in Citicorp by the Saudi Prince Waleed bin Talal bin Abdulaziz Al Saud. The Washington Post reported in 1995 that at Carlyle "Norris spent his time arranging one-shot, high-profile international business deals for a handful of wealthy Saudi investors, such as Prince Waleed Bin Talal Bin Abdulaziz Al Saud. He is not interested in the tedious work of managing firms, or looking after funds raised from pools of investors."

Norris left the Carlyle Group in January 1995, with the intention of forming his own boutique investment organization. Norris and Carlyle's other partners all said they had been moving in different directions in recent years. Carlyle co-founder Rubenstein said that Norris "wants to do different types of deals from what we want to do."

From 1992–1995 Norris also served as one of the five board members of the Federal Retirement Thrift Investment Board.

=== SCO Group assets and UnXis ===
The interest of Stephen Norris Capital Partners in the SCO Group started in February 2008, when it put forward a $100 million reorganization and debt financing plan for the failing company, which it planned to take private. There was also an unnamed Middle East partner in the proposed deal; the Associated Press reported that Prince Al-Waleed bin Talal of Saudi Arabia was involved.

After a few months of due diligence investigation of SCO's operations, finances, and legal situation, Stephen Norris Capital Partners considered a different course of action, instead proposing to purchase SCO assets outright.

Neither of those plans went forward, and instead in June 2009 a new proposal emerged from a combination of Gulf Capital Partners, of which Stephen Norris was an investor, and MerchantBridge, a London-based, Middle East-focused private equity group, to create an entity called UnXis, which would then buy SCO's software business assets for $2.4 million.

That plan did not move forward either. In April 2010, SCO's mobility software assets were sold to its former CEO, Darl McBride, for $100,000. In September 2010 the SCO Group put up the remainder of its non-lawsuit assets for public auction. Thus in February 2011, another proposal was made, this time for $600,000, with this iteration of UnXis being backed by Norris, MerchantBridge, and Gerson Global Advisors.

Some industry analysts were unsure of why Norris and his partners were wanting to acquire the SCO Unix software assets. In 2008 Ryan Paul of Ars Technica noted that "UnixWare, SCO's flagship product, hasn't seen a new release in four years." Veteran technology journalist Maureen O'Gara in 2011 called UnXis an "odd venture" which had "been offering to buy SCO since mid-2009 for reasons that aren't patently obvious to anybody."

In early March 2011, the bankruptcy court approved the sale of the Unix computer operating system to Norris's new company UnXis, since the only other bid submitted was for $18. The sale closed in April 2011, with Stephen Norris Capital Partners and MerchantBridge being the final buyers, and UnXis was formed in substance. MerchantBridge had 25 percent ownership of UnXis and Gulf Capital Partners had another 25 percent.

UnXis took over the product names, ownership, and maintenance of The SCO Group's flagship operating system products, OpenServer and UnixWare, and some 32000 service contracts for existing SCO Group customers.

The SCO Group's litigation rights against IBM and Novell did not transfer to UnXis, and The SCO Group subsequently renamed itself to The TSG Group. UnXis indicated that it had no involvement or interest in any ongoing aspects of those actions, stating "There is no place for litigation in our vision or plan", and UnXis was indemnified from any legal costs of ongoing litigation.

UnXis was initially headquartered in Las Vegas, Nevada. Its CEO was Richard Bolandz, who was a former CIO of Qwest Communications. Norris was chair of the board of UnXis and Eric Le Blan, a senior partner with MerchantBridge, was vice-chair. Several existing SCO Group executives took on C-Suite level positions.

In June 2013, UnXis changed its name to Xinuos.

=== Other ventures ===
In July 2014, Norris joined the board of the Florida-based company Global Digital Solutions.
