= Unix System Laboratories =

Former software laboratory

UNIX System Laboratories

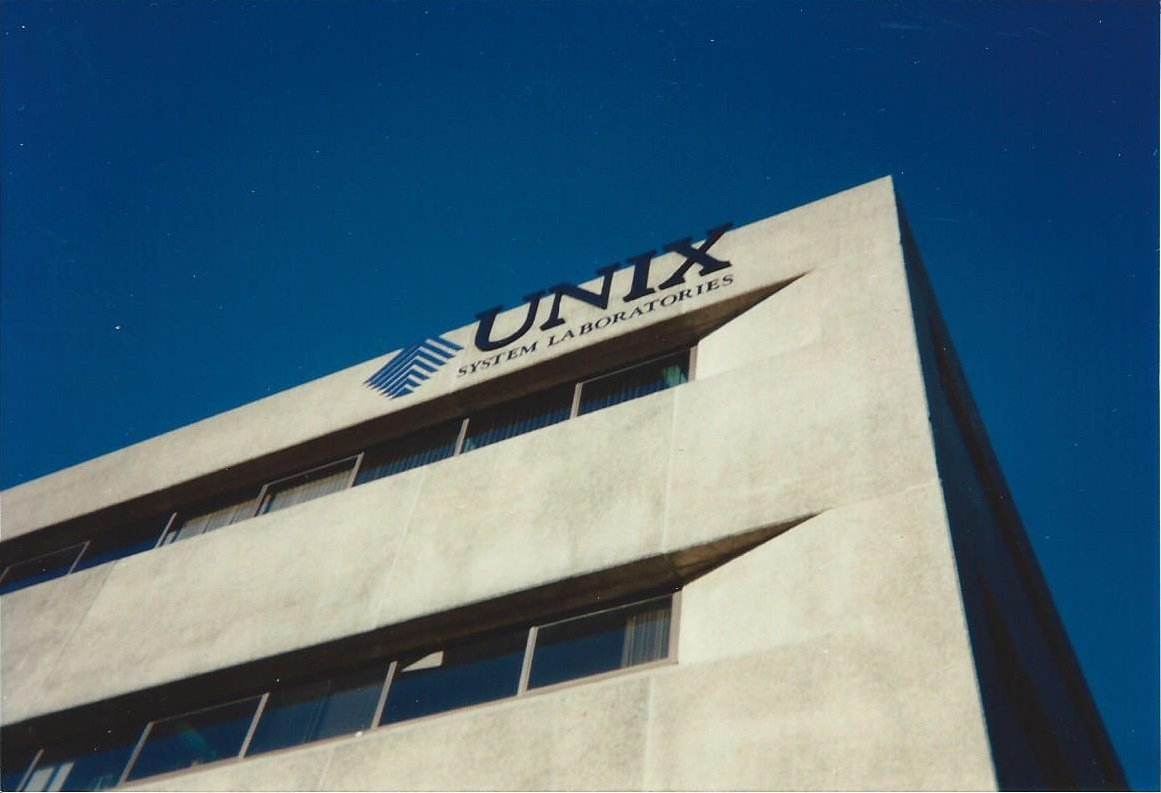
- USL logo as it appeared atop the headquarters building in Summit, New Jersey
- Type: Private
- Industry: Software products; Information technology consulting
- Predecessor: Unix division of AT&T Information Systems
- Founded: November 1989
- Fate: Acquired by Novell June 1993
- Headquarters: Summit, New Jersey, United States
- Number of locations: 3
- Key people: Roel Pieper; Michael J. DeFazio; Larry Dooling
- Products: Operating systems; transaction monitors; C++ language products
- Revenue: $100 million (1991, equivalent to $236 million today)
- Number of employees: 500 (1991)
- Divisions: UNIX System V Software; Open Solutions Software

Unix System Laboratories (USL), sometimes written UNIX System Laboratories to follow relevant trademark guidelines of the time, was an American software laboratory and product development company that existed from 1989 through 1993. At first wholly, and then majority, owned by AT&T, it was responsible for the development and maintenance of one of the main branches of the Unix operating system, the UNIX System V Release 4 source code product. Through Univel, a partnership with Novell, it was also responsible for the development and production of the UnixWare packaged operating system for Intel architecture. In addition it developed Tuxedo, a transaction processing monitor, and was responsible for certain products related to the C++ programming language. USL was based in Summit, New Jersey, and its CEOs were Larry Dooling followed by Roel Pieper.

Created from earlier AT&T entities, USL was, as industry writer Christopher Negus has observed, the culmination of AT&T's long involvement in Unix, "a jewel that couldn't quite find a home or a way to make a profit." USL was sold to Novell in 1993.

== Origins as subsidiary of AT&T ==
AT&T announced the creation of the UNIX Software Operation (USO) – a separate and distinct AT&T business unit responsible for the development, marketing, and licensing of UNIX System V software – in January 1989. This was done, as a subsequent press release stated, "in order to separate AT&T's UNIX System source code business from its computer systems business," the latter a reference to AT&T Computer Systems. USO included the AT&T Data Systems Group organizations responsible for UNIX product planning and management, licensing, and marketing. Peter J. Weinberger was named chief scientist of USO while also retaining his job in the computing science research center at Bell Labs; no other Bell Labs assets were transferred to USO. The head of USO was Larry Dooling, who had been a vice-president in sales and marketing in the AT&T Data Systems Group.

Unlike the original Unix work, which had been done in the Bell Labs facility in Murray Hill, USO and the commercialization work was done a few miles away in Summit, New Jersey. This AT&T Bell Labs location was known as SF for Summit Facility.

UNIX System Laboratories, Inc., came into being as a separate subsidiary of AT&T in November 1989 and was assigned all U.S.-based AT&T Unix and USO assets. However USO continued to operate as USO until June 1990, when the reincorporation of AT&T's European and Asian Unix business operations as wholly owned subsidiaries of USL was completed. At that point the UNIX Software Operation was publicly rebranded as UNIX System Laboratories. Again, a point of emphasis was to separate the Unix-based business from AT&T's hardware-based business. The subsidiaries were known as UNIX System Laboratories Europe, Ltd., sited near Ealing Broadway in London, and UNIX System Laboratories Pacific, Ltd., located in Shiba, Tokyo. Dooling was named the initial president of USL, continuing from his position at USO.

These organizational changes were taking place in the context of the open systems movement and the ongoing Unix wars. In consequence, the pro-AT&T side Unix International (as opposed to the anti-AT&T side Open Software Foundation) declared that "In the last 18 months AT&T has made good on its commitment to treat UNIX System as the industry asset it is and to open the UNIX System V development process to the entire industry."

== Unix System V work ==
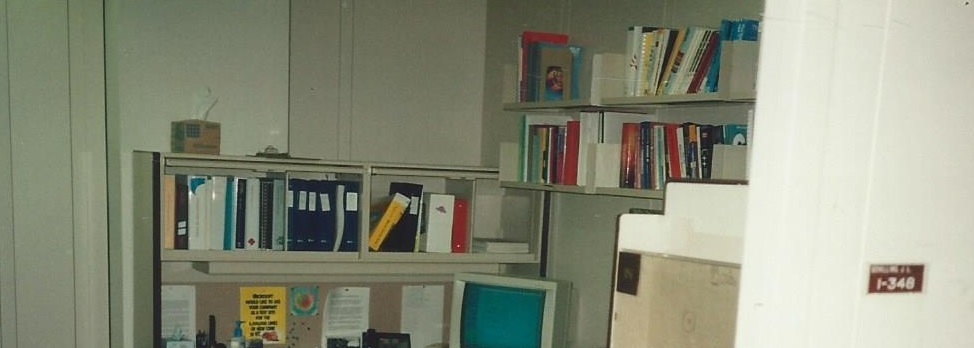
Multi-part room numbers were characteristic of the AT&T heritage of the USL office in Summit

One unit within USL, called the UNIX System V Software business unit and headed by Michael J. DeFazio, was responsible for the development of the UNIX System V base technology. DeFazio had held a similar role within USO. The USO/USL staff was heavily involved in the creation of UNIX System V Release 4, which shipped in 1989 and was a joint project with Sun Microsystems. This work incorporated technology from a variety of Unix-based efforts, including UNIX System V, BSD, and Xenix. There were additions and new innovations as well from both the AT&T and Sun sides. System V Release 4 debuted at the Unix Expo trade show in New York in November 1989, in the form of source code availability for it as well as demonstrations from Unix International of SVR4-based applications running on seventeen different vendor platforms. End-user versions of Release 4 became available during 1990.

Next USL engaged in an especially arduous effort into trying to satisfy the requirements of the National Computer Security Center's Trusted Computer System Evaluation Criteria ("Orange Book") to the B2 level. This manifested itself in System V Release 4.1 ES (Enhanced Security), which also included generally useful features such as support for dynamic loading of kernel modules.

Following that, USL worked on System V Release 4.2, which was released in June 1992. InfoWorld characterized this effort as "at the core of an assault on the enterprise networking market," with a modular architecture that stressed improved support for enterprise- and network-level administration, drivers for both Token Ring and Ethernet, and a greater ability to run on low-end machine configurations.

Multiprocessing became the focus of the final USL-based OEM release of System V, which was Release 4.2MP, released in December 1993.

USL continued the publication of an early Unix standard, the System V Interface Definition (SVID). Moreover, the SVID became one of the bases for the more important, vendor-independent POSIX standard for Unix, which System V Release 4 releases also conformed to, as well as the later Single UNIX Specification.

USL produced many books documenting various aspects of Unix System V. USL also provided some training and consulting services for Unix systems.

== Chorus and Ouverture ==
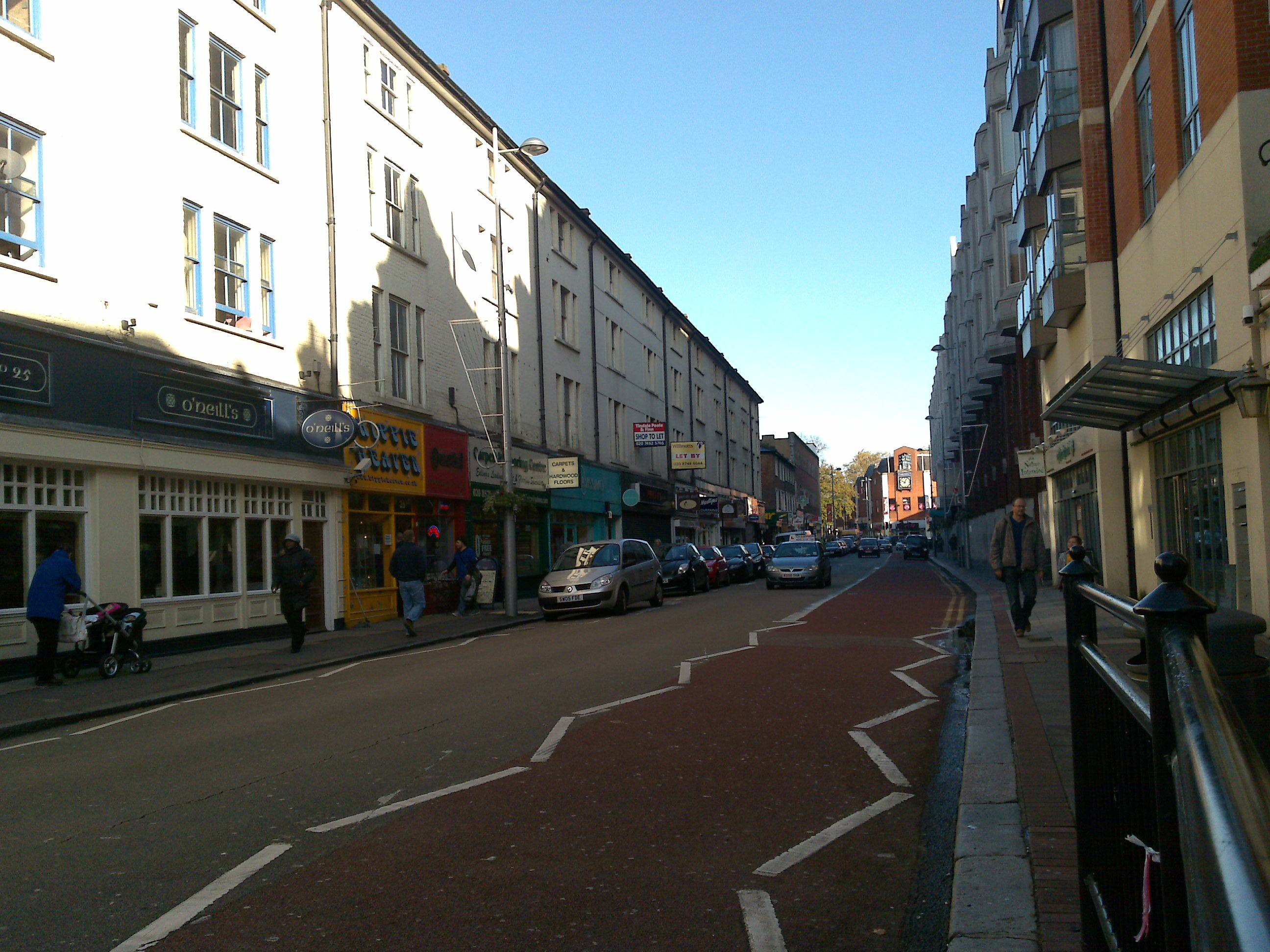
USL Europe's offices were in Ealing, London (in the building on the right side after the road bends, as seen here in 2009)

In 1991, USL forged an arrangement with the French company Chorus Systèmes SA to engage in cooperative work on the Chorus microkernel technology, with the idea of supporting SVR4 on a microkernel and thereby making it more scalable and better suited for parallel and distributed applications. As part of this, USL took a $1 million stake in Chorus Systèmes. Much of the USL Chorus work was done at the USL Europe facility in London. By 1993 the work was still ongoing, with questions of industry standardization of interfaces arising. Unisys was also part of the collaboration effort. Announcements made during 1993 promised an OEM release in 1994 and a general availability release in 1995.

This was part of the larger Ouverture project, a $14 million effort that was itself part of the European Strategic Program on Research in Information Technology (ESPRIT), overseen by the European Commission.

== Other software work ==
Another unit within USL, called the Open Solutions Software business unit and headed by Joel A. Appelbaum, was responsible for other system software that in some way worked in conjunction with Unix.

The Tuxedo transaction processing middleware had also been transferred from elsewhere in AT&T to USL. It had originated as the Loop Maintenance Operations System (LMOS) followed by the Unix Transaction System (UNITS) and was used for projects internally within AT&T. It was then renamed by USL and, as Release 4.0 of what was now called Tuxedo, in 1989 was offered for the first time as a commercial product.

USL also developed and marketed the OSI Communications Platform, which was an implementation of the OSI protocols for Unix-based networking.

== C++ language work ==
There was also a languages department at Unix System Laboratories, which was responsible for the C language compiler and development tools used to build Unix. Moreover, it was responsible for commercial sales related to the C++ language, including development tools such as the Cfront compiler that had come from AT&T. Indeed, the paper describing one of the first implementations of automatic instantiation of C++ templates in a C++ compiler had as lead author an engineer associated with Unix System Laboratories. And Margaret A. Ellis, co-author with C++ creator Bjarne Stroustrup of The Annotated C++ Reference Manual, an important publication in the history of the language, was a USL software engineer.

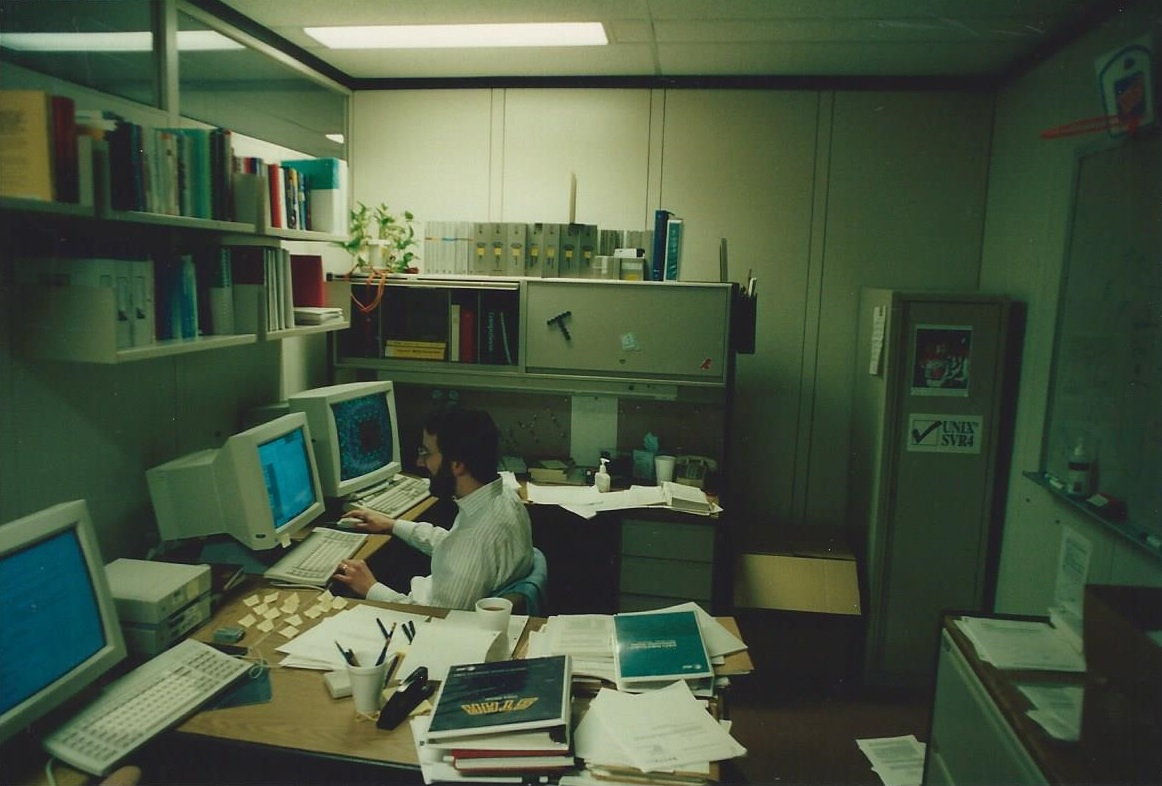
A software developer working in the Summit building

USL also continued the development of, and attempted to market, C++ Standard Components, an early instance of a C++ software foundation library that supported container classes and various other computer science-based functionality such as finite-state machines, graphs, and regular expressions. The Standard Components originated in conjunction with early developments in the C++ language in Bell Labs and became widely used internally within AT&T, by one estimate being used in hundreds of projects. They represented an effort among early library writers there to design reusable code using C++ idioms. Unlike its other offerings, which were sold to OEM vendors and resellers, here USL sold to end users. The initial release of USL C++ Standard Components to the general computing industry was labelled as Release 2.0 and occurred in 1991; it suffered from an awkward mechanism to get around the lack of templates in the container classes. That was followed by Release 3.0, which added support for templates, in 1992.

Some within USL believed that C++ Standard Components could become a language standard as well as a significant source of revenue, but it had trouble gaining traction outside of AT&T. Stroustrup would later describe these goals as "a misguided belief". In any case, all such libraries were soon eclipsed by the radically different Standard Template Library (STL), which became the standardized foundation library for the C++ language. As it happens, one of the Standard Components, array_alg, was designed by the creator of STL, Alex Stepanov, and can be considered an early predecessor of STL.

== Partial spinoff from AT&T ==
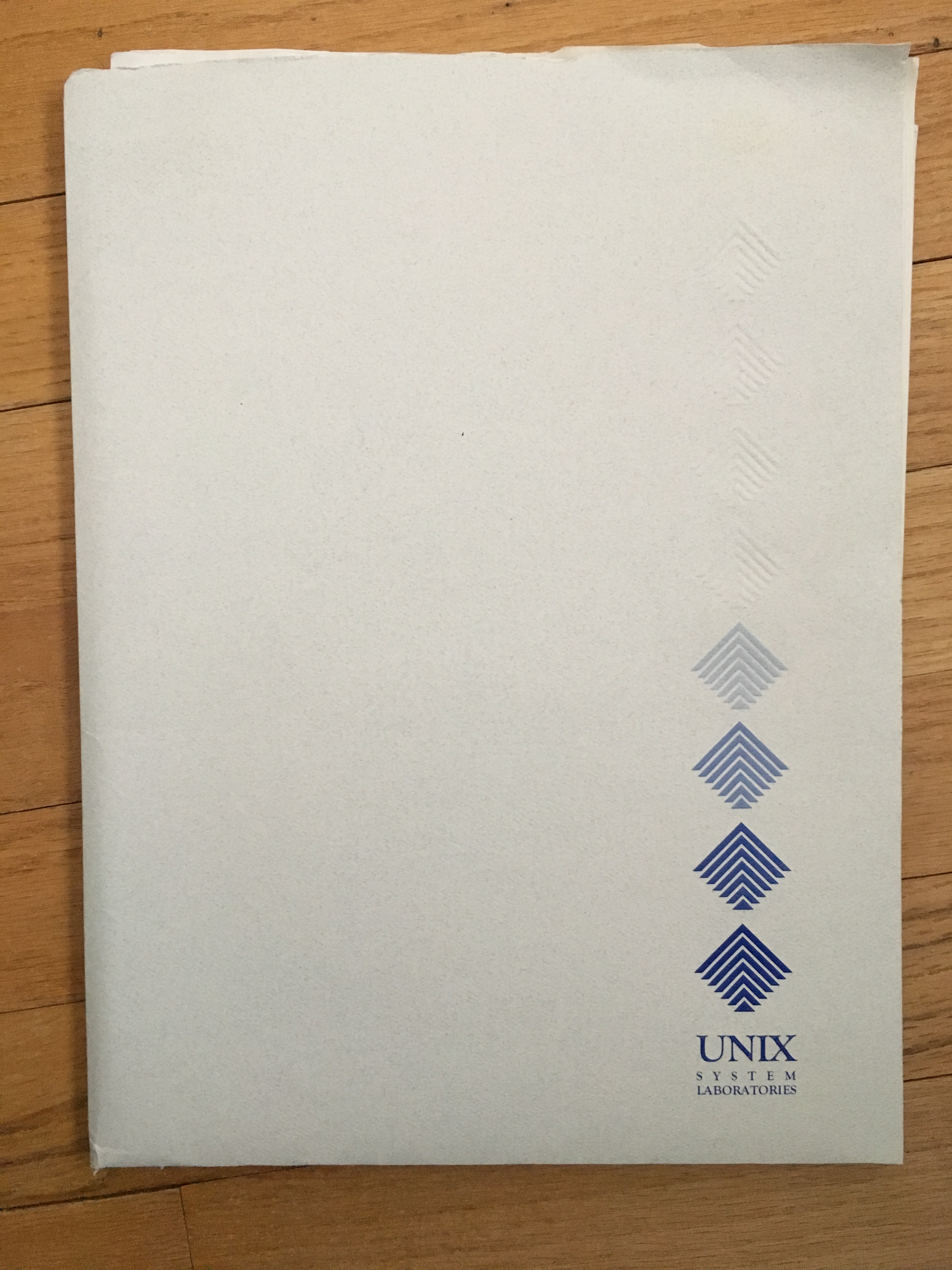
USL presentation folder, made starting 1991

In April 1991, USL became partly independent of AT&T when about 22 percent of it, worth about $65 million, was sold to eleven outside computer vendors: Amdahl, Motorola, Novell, Sun, ICL, Olivetti, Fujitsu, NEC, OKI Electric, Toshiba, and the Institute for Information Industry. There was a stated goal to lessen the control AT&T had over Unix, which would lead to USL becoming a publicly owned company within three years. An AT&T executive said, "AT&T is convinced that the best way to nurture the growth of the open systems movement and to share into it ourselves is to establish an independent Unix Systems Laboratory with the technical guidance of Unix International and the business advice of investors who will ensure that USL is run properly and profitably."

By this point USL had some 500 employees, 2400 customers, and annual revenue around the $100 million mark. AT&T said that USL had been profitable since its inception in 1989.

USL got a new president and CEO in November 1991 when Dooling was replaced by the Dutchman Roel Pieper, formerly chief technical officer of Software AG.

USL was aggressive in defending its perceived intellectual property rights, initiating as the plaintiff a lawsuit in 1992 against Berkeley Software Design makers of and the Regents of the University of California over copyrights and trademarks related to Unix. The case was known as UNIX System Laboratories, Inc. v. Berkeley Software Design, Inc. and in it USL asked the court for a preliminary injunction that would bar the Berkeley firm and the university from distributing their Net/2 operating system release, which was implied to be Unix, until the case was concluded. In response the university filed a countersuit against AT&T for alleged breaches in the licensing agreement the two parties had. (The case was settled out of court in January 1994.)

== Univel and UnixWare ==
In December 1991, USL combined with Novell to form the Univel joint venture. The goal was to make the "Destiny" desktop for Intel commodity hardware, which would be USL's first shrink-wrapped binary product, with the necessary resources for sales, marketing, and distribution being moved into the new entity. Kanwal Rekhi, a Novell vice president who helped launch Univel, said the goal was to create a "Unix for the masses".

A May 1992 InfoWorld interview with Pieper captured some of the ambitions of USL at the time, as Pieper said: "It is not just a new Unix version; rather it is the creation of an entire model change for Unix that says there are better ways to bring the benefits and features of Unix into a distributed PC environment. The earlier model did not allow Unix to play in the low-end market because of its size, complexity, and cost. The new model calls for business partnerships, such as the one with Novell, to deliver Unix to the commercial marketplace." In another interview around the same time, Pieper predicted that if the new Unix became a success, USL revenue could increase ten-fold to $1 billion within five years. Pieper acknowledged that similar Unix efforts had failed in the past, but said that the presence of Novell's PC presence and marketing experience as well as the interest of Intel would make the difference this time. Indeed, Pieper had aspirations to be another Bill Gates: "I want to be in the same position."

UnixWare 1.0, which is what Destiny became a product as, was announced on October 12, 1992. It was based on the Unix System V release 4.2 kernel. The MoOLIT toolkit was used for the windowing system, allowing the user to choose between an OPEN LOOK or MOTIF-like look and feel at run time. In order to make the system more robust on commodity desktop hardware the Veritas VXFS journaling file system was used in place of the UFS file system used in SVR4. Networking support in UnixWare included both TCP/IP and interoperability with Novell's NetWare protocols of IPX/SPX. The former were the standard among Unix users at the time of development, while PC networking was much more commonly based on the highly successful NetWare product; indeed, the base level of the Personal Edition of UnixWare did not even have TCP/IP included, while the Application Server version did.

Initial sales of UnixWare were underwhelming, with Unix facing a difficult time in the PC market. This was in part because Windows already had a stronghold there, in part because USL's third-party licensing payment obligations made low-cost sales uneconomical, and in part because of a lack of applications to run on UnixWare.

== Acquisition by Novell ==
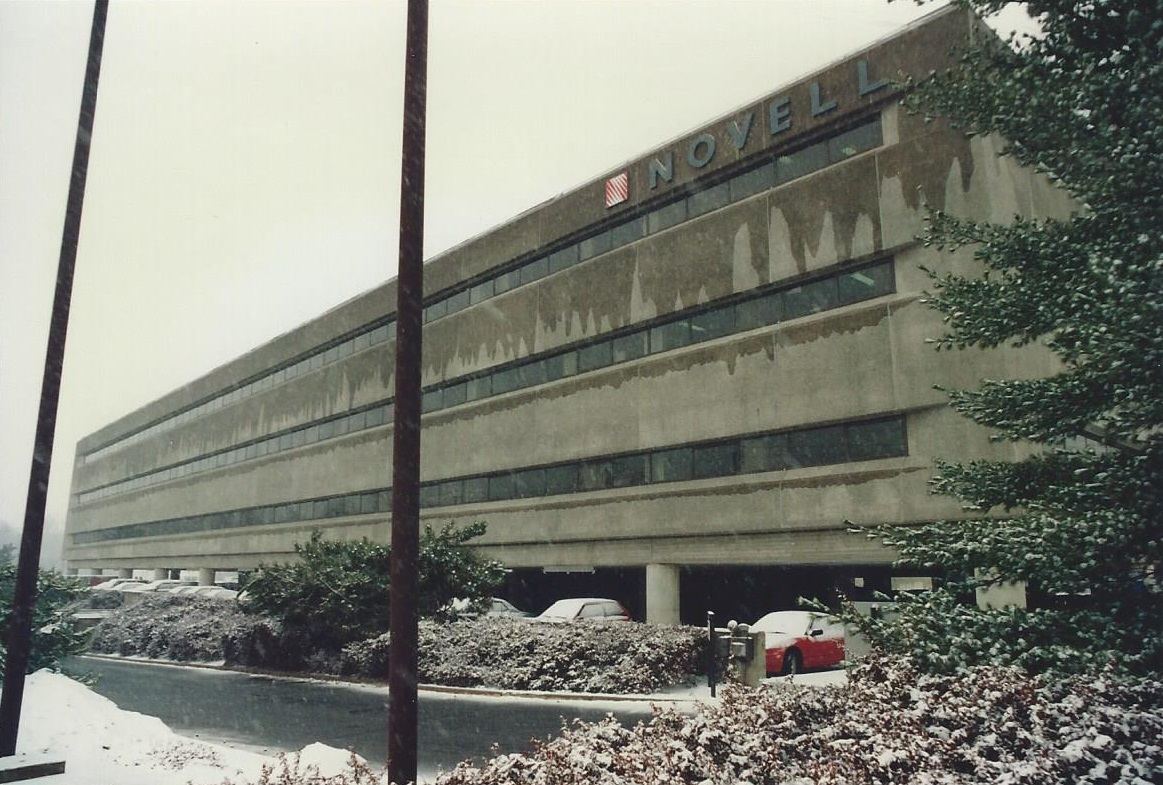
The Summit building in the Novell Unix Systems Group era

On December 21, 1992, it was announced that Novell would acquire Unix System Laboratories, and all of its Unix assets, including all copyrights, trademarks, and licensing contracts, for some $335 million in stock. The news led to large headlines of the "NOVELL BUYS UNIX" variety. The measure was intended to help Novell compete against Microsoft, which was on the verge of including networking as a built-in feature of Windows in conjunction with the Windows NT server. It was also an outgrowth of Novell chief Ray Noorda's theories about coopetition in a technology industry.

The move seemed like a long shot to analysts, with a commentary piece in Computerworld outlining the obstacles to success and stating, "Saying this deal has the technical potential to counter Windows NT is very different from predicting that it will do so."

There was negative reaction to the acquisition from USL shareholders, USL employees, and members of Unix International. Noorda had to emphasize that Novell had no plans to move USL operations from New Jersey to Utah, where Novell was based. And Noorda and Pieper had to travel to Japan to reassure USL shareholders and investors there.

Nonetheless, the deal was finalized in June 1993. Novell created the Unix Systems Group to contain the new business, which also absorbed the Univel venture. Rekhi was named as the head of the Unix Systems Group. Pieper, who had been assigned under Rekhi with little role to play, soon departed, leaving Novell in August 1993.

The USL Europe office in London was moved into Novell's facility in Bracknell, Berkshire. The Chorus work it was doing became the basis for the Novell "SuperNOS", a project to create a microkernel-based, UnixWare–NetWare hybrid, network operating system. In 1995, the USL Unix Summit facility office was transferred to Florham Park. The Summit building would then later serve as offices for Wells Fargo, and as of 2026, is now the site of a proposed affordable housing complex known as the Vanderly.

== Legacy ==
The acquisition of USL never really worked out for Novell, and was followed by Novell's misguided acquisitions of WordPerfect and Quattro Pro in another attempt to compete head-to-head with Microsoft.In particular, the "SuperNOS" project never achieved fruition.

Novell announced the sale of Unix to the Santa Cruz Operation, coincident with a licensing arrangement with Hewlett-Packard, in September 1995. Following another change of ownership, the renamed The SCO Group and the Unix System V source base became elements of the SCO–Linux disputes. After The SCO Group went bankrupt, the SCO products using the Unix System V source base were purchased by UnXis, later renamed to Xinuos.

Although it never took off within the industry, C++ Standard Components remained in the development kits for Novell UnixWare, later SCO UnixWare, into the 2000s.Tuxedo was acquired by BEA Systems in the 1990s, and then upon that firm being acquired became part of Oracle Fusion Middleware.

Novell was acquired by The Attachmate Group in 2011. The Attachmate Group was acquired by Micro Focus in 2014. Micro Focus was later acquired by OpenText in 2023.

In the view of writer Christopher Negus, "The UNIX Laboratory was considered a jewel that couldn't quite find a home or a way to make a profit. As it moved between Bell Laboratories and other areas of AT&T, its name changed several times. It is probably best remembered by the name it had as it began its spin-off from AT&T: UNIX System Laboratories (USL)." However Negus believes that in three crucial respects USL's actions – in continuing to release a source code product to its partners, in working to define industry standards such as POSIX, and in making decisions on the direction of Unix based on technical merit not corporate advantage – paved the way for the rise of a Unix-like entity such as the Linux operating system, and that this beneficial historical role has been obscured by the SCO–Linux controversies.

== See also ==
- History of Unix
