= Merge (software) =

Virtualisation software

- Developer: Locus Computing Corporation AT&T_Corporation
- Release: 9 October 1985; 40 years ago
- Operating system: SCO UNIX
- Platform: Intel 8086

Merge is a software system which allows a user to run DOS/Windows 3.1 on SCO UNIX, in an 8086 virtual machine.

== History ==
Merge was originally developed to run DOS under UNIX System V Release 2 on an AT&T 6300 Plus personal computer. Development of the virtual machine began in late 1984, and AT&T announced the availability of the machine on 9 October 1985, referring to the bundled Merge software as Simultask. (The PC 6300 Plus shipped with MS-DOS in 1985 though, because its Unix System V distribution was not ready until the end of March 1986.) Merge was developed by engineers at Locus Computing Corporation in collaboration with AT&T_Corporation engineers, especially on aspects of the system that were specific to the 6300 Plus (in contrast to a standard IBM PC/AT).

The AT&T 6300 Plus contained an Intel 80286 processor, which did not include the support for 8086 virtual machines (virtual 8086 mode) found in the 80386 and later processors in the x86 family. On the 80286, the DOS program had to run in real mode. The 6300 Plus was designed with special hardware on the bus that would suppress and capture bus cycles from the DOS program if they were directed toward addresses not assigned for direct access by the DOS virtual machine. Various system registers, such as the programmable interrupt controller (PIC), and the video controller, had to be emulated in software for the DOS process, and a watchdog timer was implemented to recover from DOS programs that would clear the interrupt flag and then hang for too long. The hardware used the non-maskable interrupt (NMI) to take control back to the emulation code.

Later, Merge was enhanced to make use of the virtual 8086 mode provided by the 80386 processor; that version was offered with Microport SVR3 starting in 1987, and subsequently with SCO Unix. There was also a Merge/286 version that ran on an unmodified PC/AT (without any special I/O trapping hardware); it ran as long as the PC program was reasonably well-behaved, though a malicious or crashing program could take the unprotected UNIX kernel down on those machines. Even so, the notoriously ill-behaved Microsoft Flight Simulator would run on the PC/AT simultaneously with Unix. These later versions were marketed directly by Locus as well as through some OEM and ISV channels. A product-evaluation version with user manual appeared in January 1987, with retail Version 1.0 of Merge/386 shipping in October of that year.

In the late 1980s, the main commercial competitor of Merge was VP/IX developed by Interactive Systems Corporation and Phoenix Technologies. AT&T's Simultask 2.0 was based on VP/IX.

In 1992, Univel UnixWare 1.0 Personal Edition came with DOS Merge 3.0 and Novell's DR DOS 6.0.

Locus eventually joined the Microsoft WISE program which gave them access to Microsoft Windows source code, which allowed later versions of Merge to run Windows shrink wrapped applications without a copy of Windows.

On 12 April 1995, Platinum Technology announced an agreement in principle to acquire Locus Computing Corporation for approximately US$33 million, about 1/4 of which was attributed to the Merge technology and product. The acquisition went through, and Platinum went on to develop the SCO Merge 4 version with Windows 95 support, which was released in 1998.

The Merge technology was bought by a company called DASCOM in 1999, which was in turn bought by IBM. A company called TreLOS was spun off in 2000 that continued the development of the virtual machine software and created Win4Lin. TreLOS later merged into NeTraverse, Inc.

The SCO Group distributes NeTraverse Merge 5.3, which supports their current products SCO OpenServer 5.x and UnixWare 7.

== Reception ==
While criticizing the AT&T 6300 Plus as poor value, InfoWorld in 1986 praised Simultask's performance and DOS compatibility on the computer. Reporting that at least one terminal emulator ran on it but not on native MS-DOS on the 6300 Plus, the magazine estimated that Simultask's performance running DOS software was comparable to that of the original IBM PC AT. Also approving of the documentation and ease of installation, InfoWorld concluded that Simultask was "an elegant and reasonably priced one-box solution for those who want to access both Unix and MS-DOS".

== See also ==
- Popek and Goldberg virtualization requirements (Dr. Popek was one of the founders of Locus)
- Windows Interface Source Environment (WISE)
