= MerchantBridge =

British private equity firm

MerchantBridge & Co.
- Type: Private
- Industry: Private equity
- Predecessor: Safron Advisors
- Founded: 2001; 25 years ago
- Defunct: March 20, 2018
- Fate: Dissolved
- Headquarters: London, UK
- Area served: Middle East
- Key people: Basil Al Rahim (Founder, CEO); Eric Le Blan (COO, Acting CEO)
- Products: Private equity funds

MerchantBridge & Co. Ltd. was a London-based boutique private equity firm that specialized in investments in the Middle East and especially Iraq, where it was one of the largest such firms. It was in existence from 2001 to 2018.

== Origins ==
The firm was founded by Basil Al Rahim – who came from a wealthy Iraqi family and was a former executive for The Carlyle Group – in 2001, with a number of wealthy figures from Arab and Gulf countries as partners. (Its origins lay in an earlier private equity firm, Safron Advisors, which had been founded in 1998 and which covered the Middle East, North Africa and Turkey.) Within the next couple of years, MerchantBridge expanded into the areas of corporate finance and government advisory work. The firm sought to embody a foreign direct investment aspect as well.

The firm's headquarters were on Sloane Street in the Royal Borough of Kensington and Chelsea within London. A number of prominent Britons became advisors to MerchantBridge, including Norman Lamont, Peter Palumbo, Baron Palumbo, Elizabeth Symons, Baroness Symons of Vernham Dean, and Andrew Buxton.

== Investments ==
In the aftermath of the 2003 invasion of Iraq, MerchantBridge did a number of investment deals in that country. These included investments in Iraq by the Qatar National Bank, Qatar Telecom, and Lafarge Cement among others. The partnership with Lafarge was especially beneficial.

The firm opened an office in Baghdad in November 2003. Al Rahim professed great faith in the potential of post-war Iraq as a business opportunity, saying in an April 2004 interview with the Financial News that he walked around Baghdad without security guards or concerns for his safety and that Iraq "is potentially the most interesting market of the next however many years. If the economic experiment goes right, we will see gross domestic product in Iraq grow 15-fold in the next seven or eight years. MerchantBridge is in a unique position, frankly, to be the leading player." He was well-connected in political circles, as his sister Rend al-Rahim Francke was Ambassador of Iraq to the United States. According to the organization Corporate Watch, MerchantBridge ranked 44th out of 66 UK companies in terms of making money in post-invasion Iraq.

MerchantBridge engaged in a number of investments elsewhere in the Middle East, such as a 2008 one with UBS that enabled the Swiss bank to set up operations in Saudi Arabia. By 2008, the firm had opened additional offices in Luxembourg, Saudi Arabia, and Dubai.

MerchantBridge persisted in trying to tap the potential of Iraq. Given the difficulties of the Iraqi post-war insurgency and sectarian violence in that country, the business environment was a challenge, but by 2009 about a third of MerchantBridge's revenues came from investments in Iraq. Al Rahim said, "To win in Iraq you have to have a genuine desire to stay the course and navigate the obstacles." In 2010 it sought to raise $50 million for a new investment vehicle, called the Mesopotamia Fund, in the country. It especially sought out investors in the United Kingdom. Eric Le Blan, the COO of MerchantBridge, said, "Similar to Saudi Arabia and the rest of the Gulf Cooperation Council in the previous decade, Iraq represents a unique investment opportunity and despite appearances is definitely open for business. Whilst other European countries such as France and Italy have recognised its huge potential, the UK's limited presence is noticeable. We are going to change that." This first $50 million tranche of funds was indeed successfully raised.

The firm did sometimes branch into other areas, such as the 2011 creation of the company UnXis, in partnership with Stephen Norris Capital Partners, to purchase the assets of troubled US software company The SCO Group. The acquisition had been in the works for two years at that point.

== Loss, legal actions, and dissolution ==
On 4 February 2011, founder and CEO Basil Al Rahim was one of seven people who died in a plane crash aboard a company private jet flying from Sulaimaniyah International Airport in the Kurdistan Region of Iraq, which crashed shortly after takeoff following an engine fire. Another MerchantBridge founding partner, Abdullah Lahoud, as well as two bankers from JP Morgan and three aircraft personnel, also died in the crash.

The loss of Al Rahim and Lahoud left the firm, according to reporting in the Abu Dhabi newspaper The National, "in disarray", with "[its] future ... in question". Several senior executives left, with Le Blan, who became Acting CEO, the only one remaining. The firm's offices in Saudi Arabia and Dubai were closed.

There was a legal dispute between Al Rahim's estate and shareholders of the firm regarding an investment the firm had made in Iraqi telecommunications company Asiacell. That dispute was settled out of court in 2012.

By 2014, Al Rahim's estate, and some of the companies that MerchantBridge had invested in, were caught up before the High Court of Justice in London in another legal dispute, involving claims by a founding partner of the firm that Al Rahim had short-changed him regarding the investment in Asiacell.

MerchantBridge became inactive, and in March 2018, it was dissolved and formally struck off the registry at Companies House.
