= Win4Lin =

Discontinued Linux software

- Developers: Virtual Bridges, Inc.
- Release: 2000; 26 years ago
- Final release: 5.5 / February 18, 2009; 17 years ago
- Operating system: Linux
- Type: Hypervisor
- License: Proprietary
- Website: http://win4lin.com/ (defunct)

Win4Lin is a discontinued proprietary software application for Linux which allowed users to run a copy of Windows 9x, Windows 2000 or Windows XP applications on their Linux desktop. Win4Lin was based on Merge software, a product which changed owners several times until it was bought by TreLOS Inc. Citing changes in the desktop virtualization industry, the software's publisher, Virtual Bridges, has discontinued Win4Lin Pro.

== Products and technology ==
In 2006, Win4Lin came in three different versions, depending on the virtualization requirements of the user.

- Win4Lin 9x allowed the user to run a full copy of Windows 98 or Windows Me inside a virtual machine.
- Win4Lin Home allowed users to only emulate applications.
- Win4Lin Pro offered users the ability to install a fully virtualized Windows 2000 or Windows XP.

The Win4Lin 9x/Pro (henceforth the only technology discussed in this section) operates by running Windows applications in a virtual machine. Unlike Wine or CrossOver which are compatibility layers, virtualization-based software such as VMware or Win4Lin require users to have a Windows license in order to run applications since they must install a full copy of Windows within the virtual machine.

Unlike VMware, however, Win4Lin provides the virtual guest operating system with access to the native Linux filesystem, and allows the Linux host to access the guest's files even when the virtual machine is not running. In addition to the convenience this offers, Computerworld found in their 2002 review that Win4Lin gained significant performance over VMware by using the native Linux filesystem, but also noted that this approach (unlike VMware's) limited the installation of only one version of Windows on a Win4Lin machine.

When the Win4Lin application starts it displays a window on the Linux desktop which contains the Windows desktop environment. Users can then install or run applications as they normally would from within Windows. Win4Lin supports Linux printers, internet connections, and Windows networking, but as of 2000, does not support DirectX and by extension most Windows games.

They also offered Win4BSD for FreeBSD.

== History ==
Win4Lin was initially based on Merge software originally developed at Locus Computing Corporation, and which changed hands several times until it ended in the assets of NeTraverse, which were purchased in 2005 by Win4Lin, Inc. Later that year, they introduced Win4Lin Pro, which was based on a “tuned” version of QEMU and KQEMU, and it hosted Windows NT-versions of Windows.

In June 2006, Win4Lin released Win4Lin Virtual Desktop Server, later named Win4VDI based on the same code base. Win4VDI for Linux served Microsoft Windows desktops to thin clients from a Linux server. It was integrated into VERDE on March 9, 2009.

Win4Lin, Inc. discontinued Win4Lin 9x on May 30, 2006. The Win4Lin Pro Desktop product ceased to be supported in March 2010.

Win4Lin version history
Version	Product line	Release date	Notes
Win4Lin 1.0	Win4Lin 9x	March/April 2000	Initial version. Support for Windows 95 and 98 installed directly to the Linux partition, file and printer sharing.
Win4Lin Desktop 2.0	Win4Lin 9x	December 5, 2000	SMP and audio support, European editions of Windows 95 and 98 installable.
NeTraverse Server Standard Edition 1.0	Win4Lin 9x Terminal Server	April 17, 2001	Client-server version of Win4Lin Desktop 2.0, allowing computers to use Windows applications running on a server.
Win4Lin 3.0	Win4Lin 9x	May 28, 2001	Linux 2.4 and networking support, new graphical installer, built-in updater.
NeTraverse Server Standard Edition 1.1	Win4Lin 9x Terminal Server	July 11, 2001	Update of NeTraverse Server to Win4Lin 3.0.
Win4Lin Workstation 4.0	Win4Lin 9x	May 20, 2002	Support for English Windows Me, Asian versions of Windows 98 SE and mouse scroll wheel.
Win4Lin Terminal Server 2.0	Win4Lin 9x Terminal Server	July 23, 2002	Update of NeTraverse Server to Win4Lin Workstation 4.0.
Win4Lin Workstation Edition 5.0	Win4Lin 9x	May 20, 2003	Support for French, Italian, German and Spanish versions of Windows Me, basic 2D DirectX applications, Winsock 2, aRts multimedia system, as well as for being a NetWare client.
Win4Lin Terminal Server 2.5	Win4Lin 9x Terminal Server	July 29, 2003	Upgrade of Terminal Server to Win4Lin Workstation Edition 5.0, with improved VNC support.
Win4Lin Workstation Edition 5.1	Win4Lin 9x	December 11, 2003	Linux 2.6 support.
Win4Lin Terminal Server 3.0	Win4Lin 9x Terminal Server	January 13, 2004	Upgrade of Terminal Server to Win4Lin Workstation Edition 5.1.
Win4Lin Home	Win4Lin 9x	January 29, 2005	Cut-down version of Win4Lin 9x 5.1. Discontinued on January 26, 2006.
Win4Lin Pro 1.0	Win4Lin Pro	February 23, 2005	QEMU-based solution. Supports Windows 2000 and experimentally XP. No kernel module required.
Win4Lin Pro 1.1	Win4Lin Pro	May 2, 2005	Full support for Windows XP, full integration between Linux and Windows filesystems.
Win4Lin Pro 2.0	Win4Lin Pro	September 1, 2005	Performance improvements, including 16-bit code, support for AMD64 CPUs.
Win4Lin Pro Desktop 2.6	Win4Lin Pro	February 28, 2006	Sound support, execution and networking performance improvements.
Win4Lin Pro Desktop 3.0	Win4Lin Pro	May 30, 2006	Unattended installation dubbed One-Click-2-Windows, copy-on-write snapshots.
Win4Lin Virtual Desktop Server	WinVDI	June 13, 2006	Successor to Win4Lin Terminal Server, supporting Windows 2000 and XP. Server can be accessed using multiple protocols, including Win4Lin's client, VNC or NoMachine. Clients can access either individual applications or desktops and print to printers connected to the client's computer. Windows installation can be reset while keeping the Documents and Settings directory.
Win4Lin Pro Desktop 3.5	Win4Lin Pro	November 30, 2006	Support for variable-speed CPUs, pop-up menu for special key combinations, improved documentation.
Win4Lin Pro Desktop 4.0	Win4Lin Pro	March 19, 2007	Shared clipboard between host and guest, enhanced graphics options for Windows XP guests, headless start, bridged networking support, better handling of non-English characters in filenames. A single license allows two concurrent user sessions at the same time.
Win4Lin Virtual Desktop Server 4.5	WinVDI	October 25, 2007	Update of VDS to Win4Lin Pro Desktop 4.5.
Win4Lin Pro Desktop 4.5	Win4Lin Pro	November 8, 2007	Better audio support with ALSA and EsounD, remote audio playback. Seamless color printing, improved mouse handling. Support for Linux 2.6.22 and newer.
Win4Lin Pro Desktop 5	Win4Lin Pro	May 15, 2008	New user interface, KVM support, seamless guest windows.
WinVDI 5.0	WinVDI	August 8, 2008	Update of VDS to Win4Lin Pro Desktop 5.0. Remote printing support.
Win4Lin Desktop 5.5	Win4Lin Pro	October/November 2008	Maintenance release.

== Reception ==
Many users reported that the 9x version ran windows software at near-native speed, even on quite low-powered machines, such as Pentium-IIs.

Nicholas Petereley praised Win4Lin in two of his columns in the year 2000, for its significantly faster performance than its competitor VMware.

== See also ==
- x86 virtualization
