= Xinuos =

American software company

Xinuos, Inc.
- Formerly: UnXis (2011–2013)
- Type: Private
- Industry: Computer software
- Founded: April 11, 2011; 15 years ago
- Founders: Stephen Norris Capital Partners; MerchantBridge
- Headquarters: Saint Croix, United States Virgin Islands, U.S.
- Area served: Worldwide
- Key people: Sean Snyder (CEO); Richard Bollandz (CEO, 2011–2013)
- Products: OpenServer 5; OpenServer 6; UnixWare 7
- Website: www.xinuos.com

Xinuos is an American software company that was created in 2011. It was first called UnXis until assuming its current name in 2013. (Both names are variations on the spelling of the Unix operating system.) Xinuos develops and markets the Unix-based OpenServer 6, OpenServer 5, and UnixWare 7 operating systems under a SCO branding indicative of prior product owners the Santa Cruz Operation and The SCO Group. Xinuos formerly sold the FreeBSD-based OpenServer 10 operating system.

== Background ==
The SCO Group (SCO) was a Utah-based software company that had over time acquired the operating system products SCO OpenServer and UnixWare, which dated back to earlier companies The Santa Cruz Operation and Unix System Laboratories and to the early history of Unix before that. But by the late 1990s these products found themselves losing in the marketplace, first to Microsoft's Windows NT and Windows Server line and then to open source Linux.

Beginning in 2003, the SCO Group began issuing proclamations and lawsuits, including SCO v. IBM, based upon a belief that SCO Unix intellectual property had been incorporated into Linux in an unlawful and uncompensated manner, resulting in what became known as the SCO–Linux disputes. Reaction to SCO's actions from the free and open source software community was intense and SCO soon became, as Businessweek headlined, "The Most Hated Company In Tech". In 2007 SCO suffered a major adverse ruling in the SCO v. Novell case that rejected SCO's claim of ownership of Unix-related copyrights and undermined much of the rest of its legal position. An appeal was filed, but meanwhile in September 2007, the SCO Group filed a voluntary petition for reorganization under Chapter 11 of the United States Bankruptcy Code.

== Origins ==
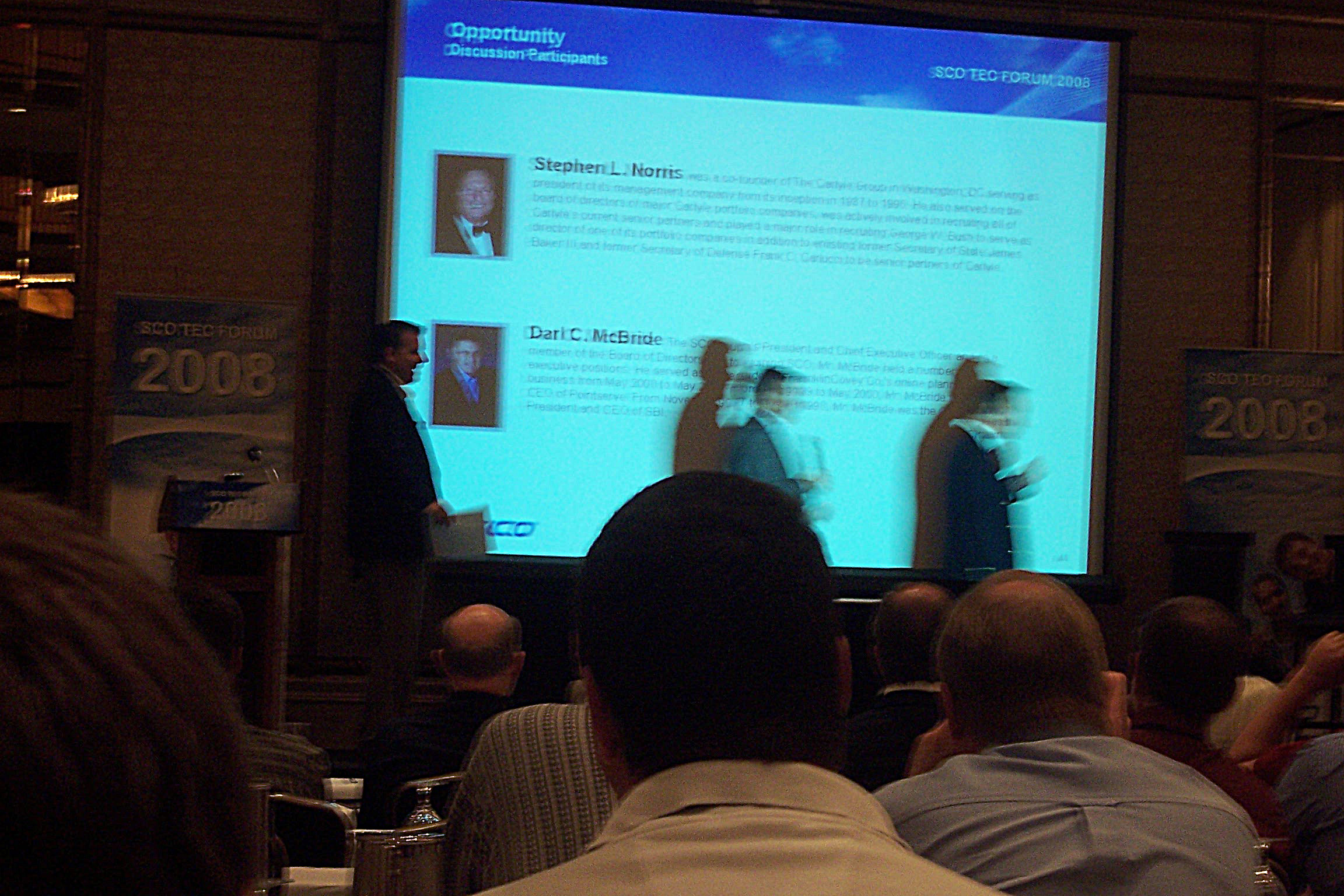
Stephen Norris appearing at the SCO Tec Forum 2008 conference in Las Vegas

The interest of Stephen Norris Capital Partners in the SCO Group started in February 2008, when it put forward a $100 million reorganization and debt financing plan for the company, which it would then take private. Stephen L. Norris had been a co-founder of the large and well-known private equity firm The Carlyle Group. There was also an unnamed Middle East partner in the proposed deal; the Associated Press reported that Prince Al-Waleed bin Talal of Saudi Arabia was involved. But after a couple of months of due diligence investigation of SCO's operations, finances, and legal situation, Stephen Norris Capital Partners considered a different course of action, instead proposing to purchase SCO assets outright. Norris appeared on stage at the SCO Tec Forum 2008 company developer and partner conference in Las Vegas in October 2008, where possible acquisition and investments plans were shown to attendees.

Neither of those plans went forward, and instead in June 2009 a new proposal emerged from a combination of Gulf Capital Partners, of which Stephen Norris was an investor, and MerchantBridge, a London-based, Middle East-focused private equity group, to create an entity called UnXis, which would then buy SCO's software business assets for $2.4 million. At that point the SCO Group had fewer than 70 employees left.

That plan, too, did not move forward. In April 2010, SCO's mobility software assets were sold to its former CEO, Darl McBride, for $100,000. In September 2010 the SCO Group put up the remainder of its non-lawsuit assets for public auction. Thus in February 2011, another proposal was made, this time for $600,000, with this iteration of UnXis being backed by Norris, MerchantBridge, and Gerson Global Advisors.

Some industry analysts were unsure of why Norris and his partners wished to acquire the SCO Unix software assets in the first place. In 2008 Ryan Paul of Ars Technica noted that "UnixWare, SCO's flagship product, hasn't seen a new release in four years." Veteran technology journalist Maureen O'Gara, who earlier during the SCO–Linux disputes had been accused of engaging in pro-SCO actions, in 2011 called UnXis an "odd venture" which had "been offering to buy SCO since mid-2009 for reasons that aren't patently obvious to anybody."

But in any case, the bankruptcy court approved this proposal, as the only other bid submitted was for $18.

== UnXis ==
The sale was closed on 11 April 2011, with Stephen Norris Capital Partners and MerchantBridge being the final buyers, and UnXis was formed in substance. (O'Gara reported that MerchantBridge had 25 percent ownership of UnXis and Gulf Capital Partners had another 25 percent.) In particular, the company took over the product names, ownership, and maintenance of The SCO Group's flagship operating system products, OpenServer and UnixWare. It also took over some 32,000 service contracts for existing SCO Group customers; these customers represented some 82 countries and business segments such as finance, retail, fast food, and governmental entities. It would be up to UnXis to hire SCO Group employees, of whom only handfuls were still left at various locations.

The SCO Group's litigation rights against IBM and Novell did not transfer to UnXis, and The SCO Group subsequently renamed itself to The TSG Group. UnXis indicated that it had no involvement or interest in any ongoing aspects of those actions: "There is no place for litigation in our vision or plan." Indeed, UnXis would be indemnified from any legal costs of ongoing litigation.

Initially, UnXis was headquartered in Las Vegas, Nevada. Its CEO was Richard Bolandz, who was a former CIO of Qwest Communications. Norris was chair of the board of UnXis and Eric Le Blan, a senior partner with MerchantBridge, was vice-chair. Several existing SCO Group executives took on C-Suite level positions.

Bolandz professed optimism on the part of himself and the UnXis backers about the SCO products, especially if they could be updated for newer requirements including cloud computing. He said those improvements would be in areas such as 64-bit computing, biometric authentication, IPv6 support, and virtualization capabilities. Virtualization support was especially critical for the existing SCO operating system products, not just because of the market trends of server consolidation and other benefits, but because it would allow the older products to run on hardware that they were otherwise uncertified or unsupported for.

Bolandz said quarterly updates of the SCO products would be forthcoming, and that SCO "is really a tremendous company with a great history and a great product that unfortunately made some very poor strategic choices." The UnXis owners said at various times in statements reported by The Salt Lake Tribune that they would invest $5–12 million in the company towards this modernization effort and towards rehiring some of the SCO employees who had been let go during the bankruptcy years.

Some industry analysts thought there was some reason to share Bolandz's view. Steven J. Vaughan-Nichols of ZDNet wrote that "I actually think UnXis has a shot at this. While I've disliked SCO's policies for the last eight years, I never disliked their products. OpenServer and UnixWare, while they're not open operating systems, are remarkably stable. ... [They occupy] a real, albeit small, server operating system niche."

By early 2013, UnXis headquarters had changed to San Mateo, California, and its president was Sean Snyder.

== Xinuos ==
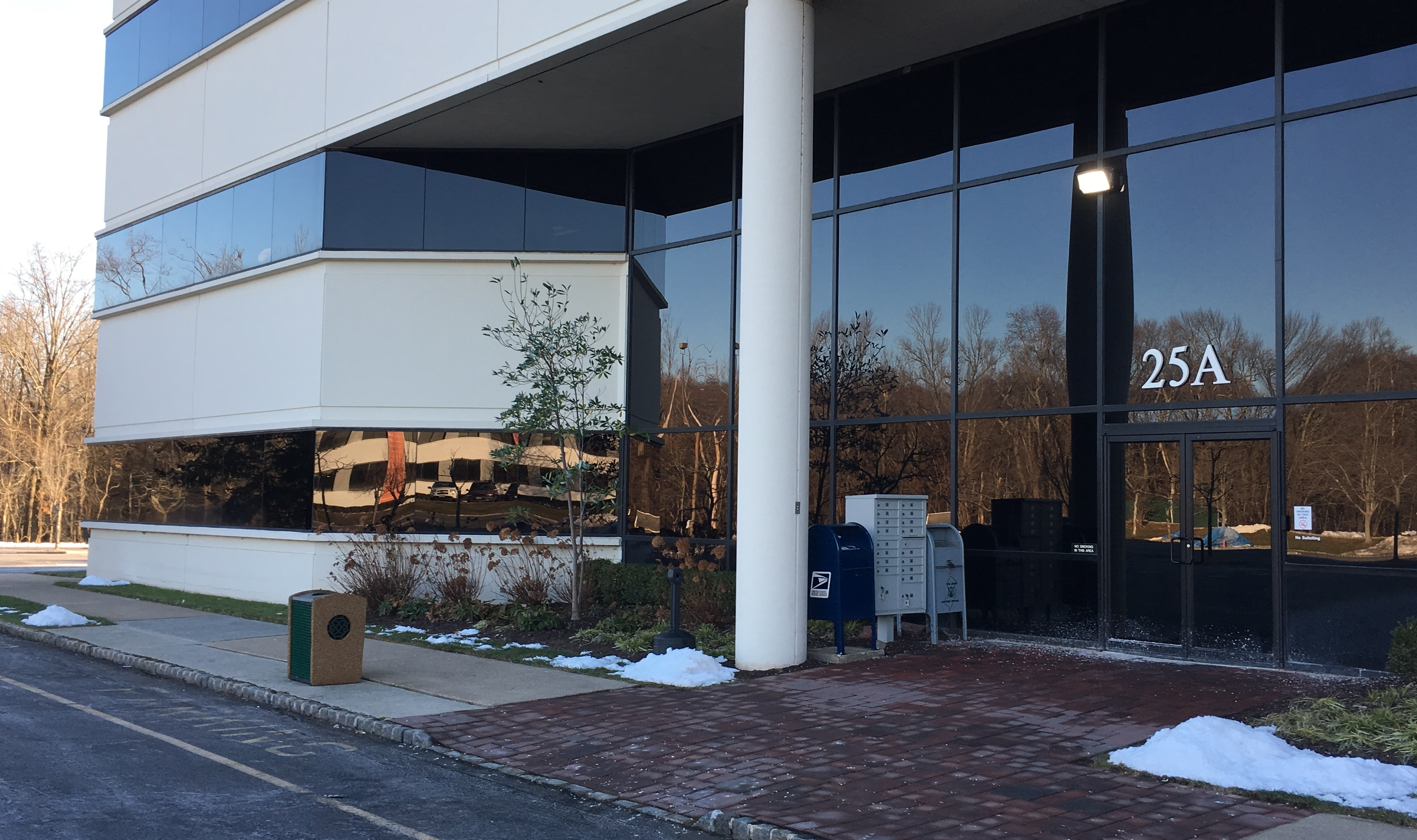
From 2008 to 2015, an office suite and lab space in this Florham Park building served as the New Jersey development offices of the SCO Group, UnXis, and Xinuos

In June 2013, the company changed its name to Xinuos. The SCO Group lawsuit against IBM was again alive in the courts, but Xinuos reiterated that it was not involved: "Since the sale of assets was completed [in 2011], we have had no further dealings with The SCO Group and have no knowledge regarding any legal action nor do we have any interest whatsoever in such proceedings." Instead, Snyder emphasized that, "The negativity directed as SCO was directed at management not at the products themselves. It's an overstatement to say the products were beloved, but not by much."

Besides San Mateo, the company had additional facilities in Berkeley, California, Florham Park, New Jersey, Bad Homburg, Germany, and Tokyo, Japan.

The initially-talked-about investments in the existing SCO products did not materialize, as by 2013 the company decided that they had been neglected too long and the cost of upgrading was too high. Instead, Snyder said, "it made more sense to adopt a modern and existing OS and transition to that."

Accordingly, in June 2015, Xinuos announced OpenServer 10, which is based on the FreeBSD operating system. It then had its general availability release as OpenServer 10 in January 2016. The FreeBSD base gave a 64-bit operating system with modern capabilities, and Xinuos adopted the open source model of the license being free and the company trying to make money from superior offerings in technical support, product maintenance, and professional services.

Simultaneously, Xinuos introduced a migration path for existing customers using older OS products. In December 2015, Xinuos released "definitive" versions of OpenServer 5, OpenServer 6, and UnixWare 7. These definitive operating system instances could run as an entity within Open Server 10, such that even if existing 32-bit SCO applications were not in a position to be recompiled from source code for OpenServer 10, they could still run under, and get some of the advantages of, the more modern environment.

For the OpenServer 10 launch Xinuos also sought to revive at least some of the famed SCO-based partner and reseller channel, which had once had over 10,000 members but by early 2016 was down to 75. One long-time SCO-focused reseller association that did remain with Xinuos was iXorg.

By early 2016, the Berkeley location had become the headquarters for Xinuos, and only the Tokyo office of the others was still open.

In December 2017, Xinuos released "Definitive 2018" versions of OpenServer 6 and UnixWare 7. This was followed in October 2018 by the release of a "Definitive 2018" version of OpenServer 5.

Some longtime SCO add-on products, such as Microlite's BackupEDGE backup/restore offering, kept their product up-to-date with the "Definitive" versions. So too did the iXorg reseller association, which continued throughout the 2010s and into the 2020s to discuss and test the latest Xinuos OS products during its regular meetings.

In May 2019, Xinuos moved its operations to the United States Virgin Islands, locating itself as a tenant in the University of the Virgin Islands Research and Technology Park in Saint Croix.

The Open Server 10 product disappeared from the Xinuos website during the latter half of 2022, and presumably is no longer sold.

Updates for the "Definitive 2018" products continued being offered into the 2020s, often focusing around inclusion of new versions of open source components such as OpenSSH, and support for additional virtualization environments such as KVM and Proxmox. Updates have also included enhancements to Xinuos' upgrade management tool, patchck.

== Lawsuit against IBM and Red Hat ==
In March 2021 Xinuos announced that it had sued IBM and its subsidiary Red Hat. The lawsuit, filed in the District Court of the Virgin Islands, claimed that IBM "stole" its intellectual property and that IBM and Red Hat together "conspired to illegally corner a market and crush competition." The action's intellectual property claims were partly rooted in the 1998, multi-company Project Monterey effort. This led some industry observers to characterize the Xinuos suit as an attempt to relitigate the SCO v. IBM case, which the company had stated multiple times that it would not do. The antitrust claims were based on more recent IBM and Red Hat activities that, as per Xinuos, included alleged agreements to divide the market and exclude Xinuos's OpenServer 10, and FreeBSD in general, from that market. In response to the action, IBM said the "allegations merely rehash the stale claims of its predecessor ... and have no merit."

The suit as filed had seven counts: one accusing IBM of copyright infringement, three accusing IBM and Red Hat of violations of the Sherman Antitrust Act, one accusing them of violations of the Virgin Islands Antimonopoly Law, and two making accusations of unfair business practices that included the IBM–Red Hat merger itself. Law360 and Bloomberg Law reported that broader claims of anti-competitive conduct were at issue in the lawsuit. Ars Technica noted that Red Hat did not hold a monopoly on Unix-like operating systems, mentioning rival distributions such as SUSE Linux Enterprise Server and Ubuntu, which produce considerable revenues for SUSE S.A. and Canonical Ltd, respectively.

In November 2022, the case was transferred from its original Virgin Islands filing site to the United States District Court for the Southern District of New York on the grounds of convenience to the parties and witnesses involved. In April 2024, U.S. District Judge Cathy Seibel issued a summary judgment against Xinuos on the copyright claim, saying that the associated litigation rights had not transferred from The SCO Group to Xinuos in the 2011 asset purchase between the two. In April 2025, Xinuos agreed to drop the counts of the lawsuit related to antitrust claims, but held onto the right to appeal the prior summary judgment on the copyright claim. Xinuos filed an appeal to the United States Court of Appeals for the Second Circuit on that copyright charge shortly thereafter.

== Products ==
The main products of Xinuos are the following:

- OpenServer 5 Definitive 2018 is an IA-32 Unix operating system which was originally developed by the Santa Cruz Operation. OpenServer 5 was a descendant of SCO UNIX, which is in turn a descendant of Xenix (SVR3.2).
- OpenServer 6 Definitive 2018 is an IA-32 Unix operating system based on the SVR5 kernel in an environment to maintain compatibility with OpenServer 5.
- UnixWare 7 Definitive 2018 is an IA-32 Unix operating system descending from AT&T UNIX System V. UnixWare 2.x and below were direct descendants of SVR4.2, and was originally developed by Unix System Laboratories (USL), Univel, Novell, and later the Santa Cruz Operation. UnixWare 7 was sold as a Unix OS combining UnixWare 2 and OpenServer 5 and was based on SVR5. UnixWare 7.1.2 was branded OpenUNIX 8, but later releases returned to the UnixWare 7.1.x name and version numbering
