= Austin Group =

Working group for the Single UNIX Specification

The Austin Group or the Austin Common Standards Revision Group is a joint technical working group formed to develop and maintain a common revision of POSIX.1 and parts of the Single UNIX Specification. It is named after the location of the first meeting in Austin, Texas.

The approach to specification development is "write once, adopt everywhere", with the deliverables being a set of specifications that carry the IEEE POSIX designation, The Open Group's Technical Standard designation, and the ISO/IEC designation. The new set of specifications is simultaneously ISO/IEC/IEEE 9945, and forms the core of the Single UNIX Specification Version 3. The IEEE formerly designated this standard as 1003.1.

This unique development combines both the industry-led efforts and the formal standardization activities into a single initiative, and includes a wide spectrum of participants.

The group currently has approximately 500 participants, and is chaired by Andrew Josey from The Open Group. The Open Group manages the day-to-day running of the group, providing the chair, the editor and email and web facilities. There are no fees for participation or membership.

The decision-making process is divided between the three entities that publish the resulting standard: ISO/IEC (Joint Technical Committee 1, subcommittee 22, working group 15), IEEE PASC (Portable Applications Standards Committee) and The Open Group, with each of these appointing an Organisational Representative (OR). The three ORs judge if there is consensus, and are responsible for initiating ballots within their respective organisations as required.

Organisation	Representative
ISO/IEC JTC 1/SC 22	Nick Stoughton
IEEE PASC	Don Cragun
The Open Group	Martin Rehak
