= Margaret A. Ellis =

- Education: University of California
- Occupation: Author
- Known for: Author of computer books.

Margaret A. Ellis is a notable author of computer books.

Ellis received a master of science degree in computer science from the University of California. She is the coauthor of The Annotated C++ Reference Manual, with Bjarne Stroustrup. She also coauthored Designing and Coding Reusable C++ with Martin D. Carroll (1995). She has worked for AT&T Bell Laboratories, UNIX System Laboratories, and Novell in compiler development.
