= Univel =

American software company

Univel, Inc.

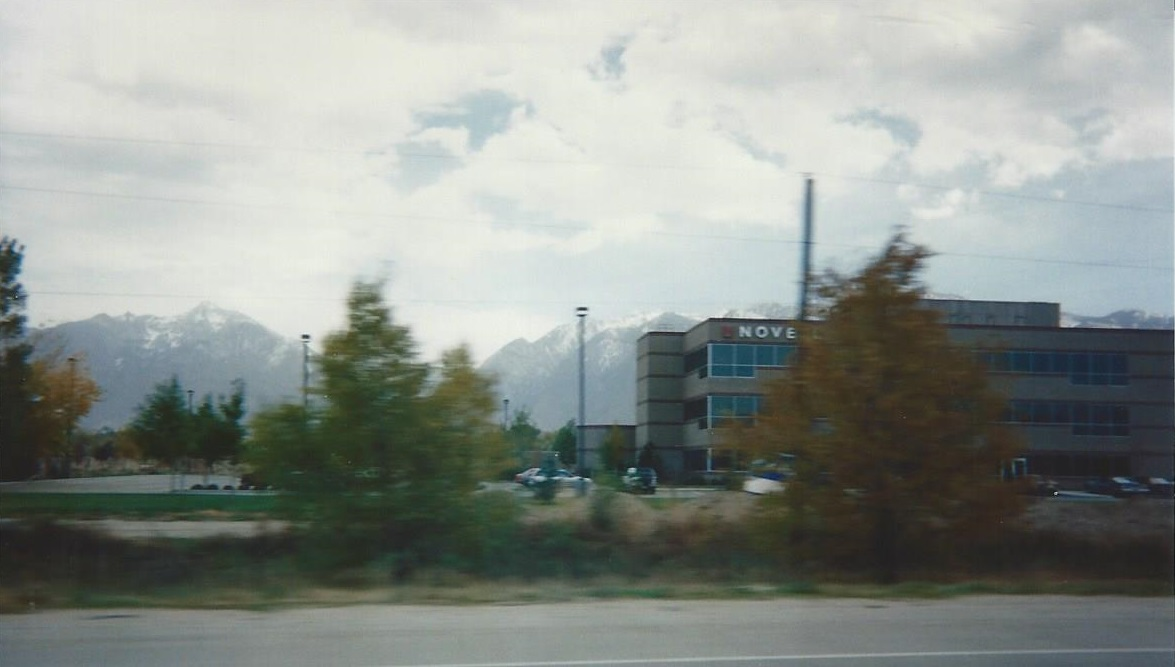
- Univel main engineering building in Sandy, Utah
- Company type: Private Joint venture
- Industry: Software products
- Founded: December 1991; 34 years ago
- Fate: Fully acquired by Novell June 1993
- Headquarters: San Jose, California, United States
- Number of locations: 3
- Key people: Joel Applebaum
- Products: Operating systems
- Parent: Novell and Unix System Laboratories

Univel, Inc. was a joint venture of Novell and AT&T's Unix System Laboratories (USL) that was formed in December 1991 to develop and market the Destiny desktop Unix operating system, which was released in 1992 as UnixWare 1.0. Univel existed only briefly in the period between AT&T initially divesting parts of USL in 1991, and its eventual outright purchase by Novell, which completed in June 1993, thereby acquiring rights to the Unix operating system. Novell merged USL and Univel into their new Unix Systems Group (USG).

== Beginning ==
Novell was the leader in network operating system software, with its product NetWare, while Unix System Laboratories was an AT&T majority-owned entity responsible for the development and maintenance of one of the main branches of the Unix operating system, the UNIX System V Release 4 source code product. The idea to combine forces originated during 1991, with USL chief Roel Pieper believing that the advent of 32-bit applications and workgroup computing gave Unix its best chance yet to gain widespread acceptance. Pieper brought the idea to Novell chief Ray Noorda, as Novell's executives were already looking for a way to gain entry into enterprise computing. In particular, Novell executive vice president Kanwal Rekhi played a significant role in the formation and launching of Univel.

Logo used 1991 to 1992

Initial word that Novell and USL were planning a joint venture came in October 1991 with a memorandum of understanding between the two. Univel was then formed in December 1991, with public announcement of the formation being made on December 12, 1991. Novell had a 55 percent share of the new entity. The president of Univel was Joel Applebaum, who had previously been a vice president at Unix System Laboratories. Univel had some $30 million in initial financing.

The headquarters for Univel was in Novell's offices in San Jose, California, where much of the sales and marketing effort also took place. The main engineering office was in Sandy, Utah, where development work for the NetWare for Unix client was done among other components (there were also Univel liaison staff located at Novell's main Provo offices). Finally, there was also a small group in USL's offices in Summit, New Jersey assigned to the Univel effort, whose roles included ISV support engineering.

For Unix System Laboratories, Univel was its first foray into the binary, shrink-wrapped software product market. While the initiative initially focused on Intel x86-based systems, there were also ideas within Univel to later support the Sun SPARC and MIPS architectures, and possibly the in-the-works Advanced RISC Computing architecture as well.

== UnixWare ==
Univel had only one product, the UnixWare operating system (UnixWare was a trademark of Univel). The aim was to make Unix successful in a desktop computer environment. As such, the premise of UnixWare for personal use was that it would target the higher end of the PC range with a GUI-based, shrink-wrapped Unix that was oriented towards novice users that would easily drop into a NetWare-based local area network. In terms of sales motion, the product could then take advantage of Novell's large channel of 12,000 resellers and distributors.

Predictions that Unix could become successful on the desktop had already started being made by the late 1980s, and would become a recurring theme of Unix technology. Rekhi said in early 1992 said that they were aiming to produce a "Unix for the masses", in particular "a desktop strain of Unix that isn't so damned hard to use," with matching the friendliness of an Apple Macintosh being an ideal goal. Others were skeptical of the goal; one executive at a Utah-based consulting company said of Univel, "They're dreaming on the client", with simply too much catching up to do to ever effectively challenge Microsoft Windows.

The Univel splash screen

Part of the challenge of the "Destiny" project was reducing System V Unix to a profile that would work on an Intel-based PC. The USL SVR4.2 technology is used in this project. The MoOLIT toolkit is used for the windowing system, allowing the user to choose between an OPEN LOOK or MOTIF-like look and feel at runtime. In order to make the system more robust on commodity desktop hardware, the Veritas VXFS journaling file system is used in place of the UFS file system used previously. As part of sizing, Unix commands such as grep and awk that were viewed as unnecessary for end users are eliminated; the number of supported fonts is reduced; and developer tools are unbundled. Of prime importance was that a system running UnixWare could be easily incorporated into a NetWare-based local area network.

An early access release of UnixWare for software developers was made in June 1992; Univel secured pledges from some seventy independent vendors to develop their products to run on UnixWare. The GA release of UnixWare itself came in December 1992. UnixWare came in two flavors, the Personal Edition and the Application Server. In addition, a Software Development Kit was a separately priced product. A key distinction between the two flavors was that the Personal Edition comes with only NetWare's IPX/SPX networking stack, whereas the Application Server comes with TCP/IP as well; the absence of TCP/IP in the desktop release, unless ordered as an add-on, served to annoy many Unix proponents. The Personal Edition also comes with DOS Merge 3.0 and DR DOS 6.0 to try to provide compatibility with Microsoft-based applications; this was forced, as other than WordPerfect and Lotus 1-2-3, none of the major personal computer applications had native Unix ports available for UnixWare.

Industry trade press reviews of UnixWare were generally favorable. UNIX Review called it "an attractive product" with "a fair chance of capturing a portion of the desktop market", although it said the NetWare and DOS support needed to be improved. InfoWorld praised the "multilayered architecture that neatly supports multiple graphical user interfaces, several Unix file systems, and NetWare interoperability."

Sales were another matter. InfoWorld said that a significant market share for a desktop competitor would be in the millions of copies purchased. But in its first six weeks on the market, UnixWare only sold 13,000 copies. In April 1993, Univel announced a lowering of its initial pricing scheme. But that did not help; by August 1993, total sales were still less than 25,000, a number that definitely did not meet Univel's expectations.

== End ==
On December 21, 1992, it was announced that Novell would acquire Unix System Laboratories, and all of its Unix assets, including all copyrights, trademarks, and licensing contracts. The Novell acquisition closed in June 1993; at that point, Univel became a fully owned subsidiary of Novell.

By one industry account, Univel ceased to exist in July 1993, when both it and Unix Systems Laboratories became that Novell's Unix Systems Group. However, another industry account portrayed Novell briefers as saying in August 1993 that Univel was the entity actively working on the follow-on UnixWare 1.1 release. In any case, changes of management were in the offing; both Univel head Joel Applebaum, and Unix Systems Laboratories head Roel Pieper, soon departed Novell. Industry news releases were still referring to UnixWare as a product of Univel into 1994, but the name subsequently fell into disuse.

Speaking in retrospect, one unnamed Novell executive said in August 1994, "Univel was a nightmare. It was the bastard child of Novell and USL. Neither parent loved it." The remark was said in the context of maintaining that under Novell's more focused guidance, the next major release of the Univel's product, UnixWare 2, would be better and more successful, and that UnixWare would focus on server-side capabilities. On the other hand, InfoWorld had thought that "For Novell, UnixWare is a low-risk, high-return gamble."

Efforts by other players to make 'Unix on the desktop' a success did not work either. Years later they would be followed by equally unsuccessful efforts toward 'Linux on the desktop'. Univel is one episode of a complex saga of Unix and Linux history, including Unix wars, competing consortia, competing UI frameworks, competing desktop representations, Linux desktop wars, fragmentation, forks, forks on top of previous forks, and more.
