= OpenServer =

Closed source version of Unix developed by SCO

- SCO OpenServer 5.0.7 running the X.desktop interface
- Developer: SCO, Caldera Systems, Caldera International, The SCO Group, Xinuos
- OS family: UNIX System V (SVR3.2/SVR5), BSD
- Working state: Current
- Source model: Closed source
- Initial release: 1989; 37 years ago
- Latest release: OpenServer 6 Definitive 2018 SVR5 / 2017; 9 years ago
- Supported platforms: IA-32
- Kernel type: Monolithic kernel
- Userland: POSIX / SUS
- License: Proprietary
- Preceded by: Xenix
- Official website: OpenServer 6 OpenServer 5

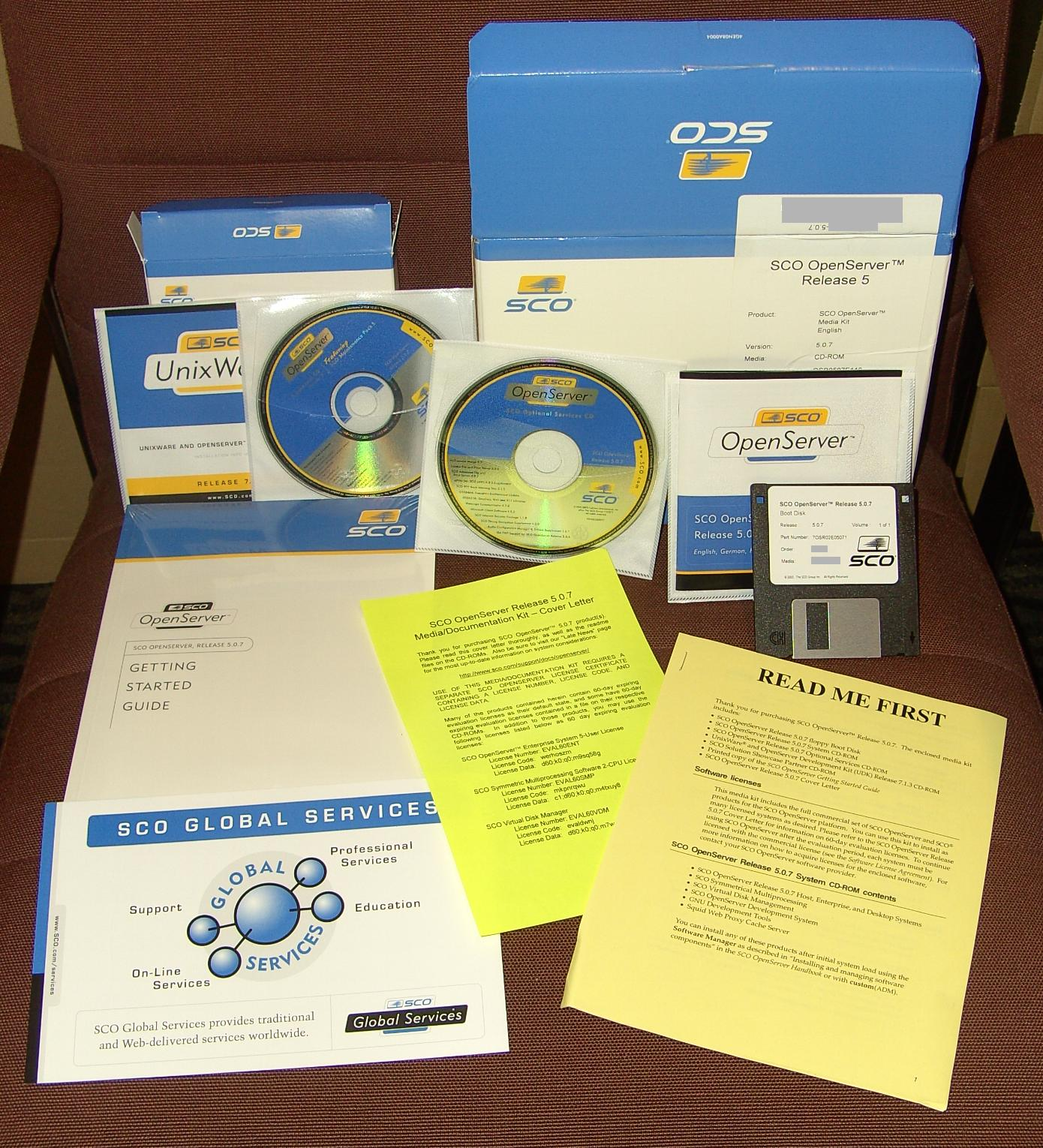
SCO OpenServer Release 5.0.7 box set

Xinuos OpenServer, previously SCO UNIX and SCO Open Desktop (SCO ODT), is a closed source computer operating system developed by Santa Cruz Operation (SCO), later acquired by SCO Group, and now owned by Xinuos. Early versions of OpenServer were based on UNIX System V, while the later OpenServer 10 is based on FreeBSD 10. However, OpenServer 10 has not received any updates since 2018 and is no longer marketed on Xinuos's website, while OpenServer 5 Definitive and 6 Definitive are still supported.

== History ==
=== SCO UNIX/SCO Open Desktop ===
In 1987 AT&T Corporation, Microsoft, and Sun Microsystems agreed to combine their versions of the Unix operating system. Santa Cruz Operation (SCO) sublicensed Microsoft's Xenix and wanted to retain the Xenix name, but AT&T said "If they want to call it Unix, they've got to use it the way it is. We don't want another set of variants".

SCO UNIX was the successor to Xenix, derived from UNIX System V Release 3.2 with an infusion of Xenix device drivers and utilities. SCO UNIX System V/386 Release 3.2.0 was released in 1989, as the commercial successor to SCO Xenix. The base operating system did not include TCP/IP networking or X Window System graphics; these were available as optional extra-cost add-on packages. Shortly after the release of this bare OS, SCO shipped an integrated product under the name of SCO Open Desktop, or ODT. 1994 saw the release of SCO MPX, an add-on SMP package.

At the same time, AT&T completed its merge of Xenix, BSD, SunOS, and UNIX System V Release 3 features into UNIX System V Release 4. SCO UNIX remained based on System V Release 3, but eventually added home-grown versions of most of the features of Release 4.

The 1992 releases of SCO UNIX 3.2v4.0 and Open Desktop 2.0 added support for long file names and symbolic links. The next major version, OpenServer Release 5.0.0, released in 1995, added support for ELF executables and dynamically linked shared objects, and made many kernel structures dynamic.

=== SCO OpenServer ===
SCO OpenServer 5, released in 1995, would become SCO's primary product and serve as the basis for products like PizzaNet (the first Internet-based food delivery system done in partnership with Pizza Hut) and SCO Global Access, an Internet gateway server based on Open Desktop Lite. To compete with Windows NT and Linux, by 1997 SCO was distributing single-user licenses for educational use for $19, the cost of the CD-ROM, or completely free at trade shows. Due to its large installed base, SCO OpenServer 5 continues to be actively maintained by SCO with major updates having occurred as recently as September 2018.

SCO OpenServer 6, based on the merging of Openserver 5 and large portions of Unixware 7 was initially released by The SCO Group in 2005. It includes support for large files, increased memory, and multi-threaded kernel (light-weight processes). This merged codebase is UNIX System V Release 5 (SVR5) of which the original version is seen in Unixware 7; SVR5 is only used by Xinuos. SCO OpenServer 6 contains the UnixWare 7's SVR5 kernel integrated with SCO OpenServer 5 application and binary compatibility, OpenServer 5 system administration, and OpenServer 5 user environments. Unixware 7 was itself based on a merger of AT&T UNIX System V Release 4.2MP (Unixware 2) and select technologies from OpenServer 5.

SCO OpenServer has primarily been sold into the small and medium business (SMB) market. It is widely used in small offices, point of sale (POS) systems, replicated sites, and backoffice database server deployments. Prominent larger SCO OpenServer customers include McDonald's, Taco Bell, Big O Tires, Pizza Hut, Costco pharmacy, NASDAQ, The Toronto Stock Exchange, Banco do Brasil, many banks in Russia and China, and the railway system of India.

=== UnixWare merger ===
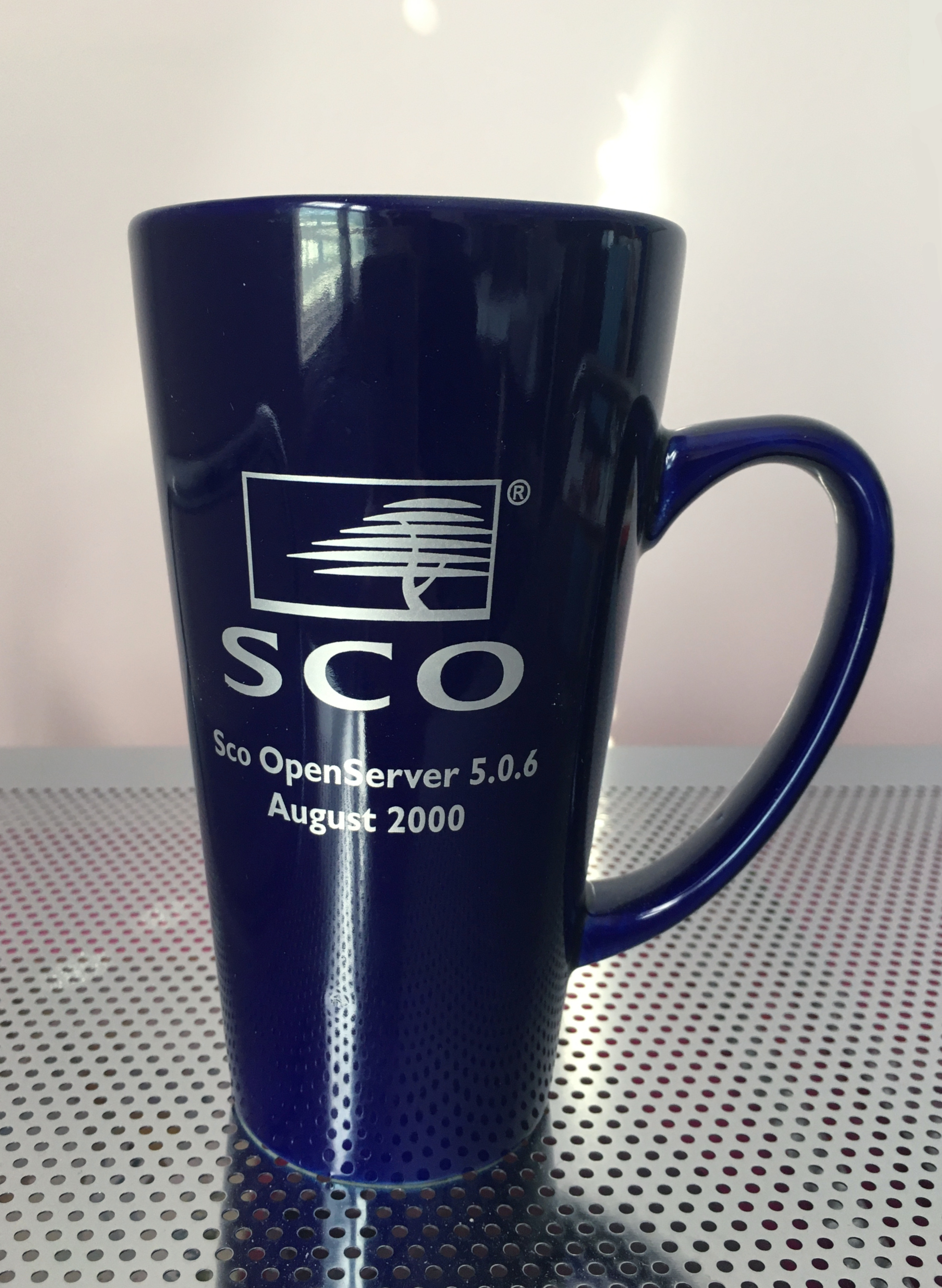
Commemorative cup for the SCO OpenServer 5.0.6 release

SCO purchased the right to distribute the UnixWare system and its System V Release 4 code base from Novell in 1995. SCO was eventually able to re-use some code from that version of UnixWare in later releases of OpenServer. Until Release 6, this came primarily in the compilation system and the UDI driver framework and the USB subsystem written to it.

SCO announced on August 2, 2000, that it would sell its Server Software and Services Divisions, as well as UnixWare and OpenServer technologies, to Caldera Systems, Inc. The purchase was completed in May 2001. The remaining part of the SCO company, the Tarantella Division, changed its name to Tarantella, Inc., while Caldera Systems became Caldera International, and subsequently in 2002, the SCO Group.

=== Under The SCO Group ===
OpenServer logo at the time of The SCO Group

The SCO Group continued the development and maintenance of OpenServer. On June 22, 2005, OpenServer 6.0 was released, codenamed "Legend", the first release in the new 6.0.x branch. SCO OpenServer 6 is based on the UNIX System V Release 5 kernel, a merged codebase of UNIX System V Release 4.2MP and UnixWare 7. OpenServer 6.0 features multi-threading application support for C, C++, and Java applications through the POSIX interface. OpenServer 6 features kernel-level threading (not found in 5.0.x).

Some improvements over OpenServer 5 include improved SMP support (support for up to 32 processors), support for files over a terabyte on a partition (larger network files supported through NFSv3), better file system performance, and support for up to 64GB of memory.

OpenServer 6.0 maintains backward-compatibility for applications developed for Xenix 286 onwards.

The SCO Group went bankrupt in 2007, after a long series of legal battles.

=== UnXis / Xinuos (2011–present) ===
The rights to OpenServer, as well as UnixWare, were acquired by UnXis in 2011, which was later renamed Xinuos.

In June 2015, Xinuos announced OpenServer 10, which is based on the FreeBSD 10 operating system. Simultaneously, Xinuos introduced a migration path for existing customers using older OS products. In December 2015, Xinuos released "definitive" versions of OpenServer 5, OpenServer 6, and UnixWare 7.

In December 2017, Xinuos released "Definitive 2018" versions of OpenServer 6 and UnixWare 7, and in October 2018 OpenServer 5 Definitive 2018 was released. The "Definitive 2018" releases were a commitment by Xinuos to keep the legacy OS's updated and supported protecting the applications that customers need to continue to run. The Definitive 2018 products contain major updates over the Definitive releases, and an updated development kit was released which makes it easier to compile current packages for the Definitive 2018 products.

However, by 2023, OpenServer 10 was no longer listed as a product on Xinuos' home page, implying that it had been withdrawn from marketing.

== Versions ==
Version	Basis	Date	Codename	Editions/Notes
SCO UNIX System V/386	SVR3.2.0	1989	?	Currently renamed to OpenServer 5
Open Desktop 1.0	SVR3.2.1	1990	?	
Open Desktop 1.1	SVR3.2v2.0	1991	?	Supplement for upgrade to 3.2v2.1
SCO UNIX	SVR3.2v4.0	1992	?	
Open Desktop 2.0	SVR3.2v4.1	1992	Phoenix	Desktop System, Server
Open Desktop/Server 3.0	SVR3.2v4.2	1994	Thunderbird	Open Desktop, Open Desktop Lite, Open Server
OpenServer 5.0	SVR3.2v5.0	1995	Everest	Desktop System, Host System, Enterprise System
OpenServer 5.0.2	SVR3.2v5.0.2	1996	Tenzing	Desktop System, Host System, Enterprise System, Internet FastStart
OpenServer 5.0.4	SVR3.2v5.0.4	1997	Comet	Desktop System, Host System, Enterprise System
OpenServer 5.0.5	SVR3.2v5.0.5	1999	Davenport	Host System, Desktop System, Enterprise System
OpenServer 5.0.6	SVR3.2v5.0.6	2000	Freedom	Host System, Desktop System, Enterprise System
OpenServer 5.0.7	SVR3.2v5.0.7	2003	Harvey West	Host System, Desktop System, Enterprise System
OpenServer 6.0	SVR5	2005	Legend	A "merge" of UnixWare 7 and OpenServer 5
OpenServer 5.0.7V	SVR3.2v5.0.7	2009	?	OpenServer 5.0.7V import a pre-installed Virtual Appliance/Machine onto the VMware hypervisor.
OpenServer 10	FreeBSD 10	2015	10.0	First release based on FreeBSD 10 and Xinuos enhancements
OpenServer 6 Definitive	SVR5	2015	Definitive	Upwards compatible with OpenServer 6 Definitive 2018
OpenServer 5 Definitive	SVR3.2v5.0.7	2015	Definitive	Upwards compatible with OpenServer 5 Definitive 2018
OpenServer 10.3 (discontinued)	FreeBSD 10.3	2016	10.3	Release based on FreeBSD & Xinuos enhancements. Update from 10.0 and 10.2
OpenServer 6 Definitive 2018	SVR5	2017	Definitive 2018	In-place upgrade from previous supported versions
OpenServer 5 Definitive 2018	SVR3.2v5.0.7	2018	Definitive 2018	In-place upgrade from previous supported versions

== See also ==
- Santa Cruz Operation
- SCO v. Novell
- SCO Skunkware
