= UnixWare =

Unix operating system

- UnixWare 7.1.4, showing the CDE desktop
- Developer: Xinuos (previously Univel, Novell, SCO, Caldera Systems, Caldera International, The SCO Group)
- OS family: Unix (SVR4.2/SVR5)
- Working state: Current
- Source model: Closed source
- Initial release: 1992; 34 years ago
- Latest release: 7 Definitive 2018 (D2M1b) / 2022; 4 years ago
- Kernel type: Monolithic kernel
- Userland: POSIX / SUS
- License: Proprietary
- Preceded by: UNIX System V
- Official website: Official website

UnixWare is a Unix operating system. It was originally released by Univel, a jointly owned venture of AT&T's Unix System Laboratories (USL) and Novell. It was then taken over by Novell. Via Santa Cruz Operation (SCO), it went on to Caldera Systems, Caldera International, and The SCO Group before it was sold to UnXis (now Xinuos). After the acquisition of SCO by Caldera, the name was briefly changed to Open UNIX before being reverted to the original name in the next release. Binary distributions of UnixWare are available for x86 architecture computers. UnixWare is primarily marketed and deployed as a server operating system.

== History ==
=== 1991–1993: Univel ===
After the SVR4 effort to merge SunOS and System V, AT&T's Unix System Laboratories (USL) formed the Univel partnership with Novell to develop a desktop version of Unix for i386 and i486 machines, codenamed "Destiny".

Destiny is based on the Unix System V release 4.2 kernel. The MoOLIT toolkit is used for the windowing system, allowing the user to choose between an OPEN LOOK or MOTIF-like look and feel at runtime. In order to make the system more robust on commodity desktop hardware, the Veritas VXFS journaling file system is used in place of the UFS file system used in SVR4. Networking support in UnixWare includes both TCP/IP and interoperability with Novell's NetWare protocols (IPX/SPX); the former were the standard among Unix users at the time of development, while PC networking was much more commonly based on NetWare.

Destiny was released in 1992 as UnixWare 1.0, with the intention of unifying the fragmented PC Unix market behind this single variant of the operating system. The system was earlier to reach the corporate computing market than Microsoft's Windows NT, but observers of the period remarked that UnixWare was "just another flavor of Unix", Novell's involvement being more a marketing ploy than a significant influx of technology. There two editions of Destiny: a Personal Edition, which includes Novell IPX networking but not TCP/IP, and an Advanced Server Edition with TCP/IP and other server software. The personal edition is limited to two active users, while the server edition includes an unlimited user license. Around 35,000 copies of UnixWare 1.0 were sold.

In 1992, UnixWare 1.0 Personal Edition came with DOS Merge 3.0 and Novell's DR DOS 6.0.

In 1993, Novell purchased USL from AT&T and merged USL and Univel into a new Unix Systems Group.

=== 1993–1995: Novell ===
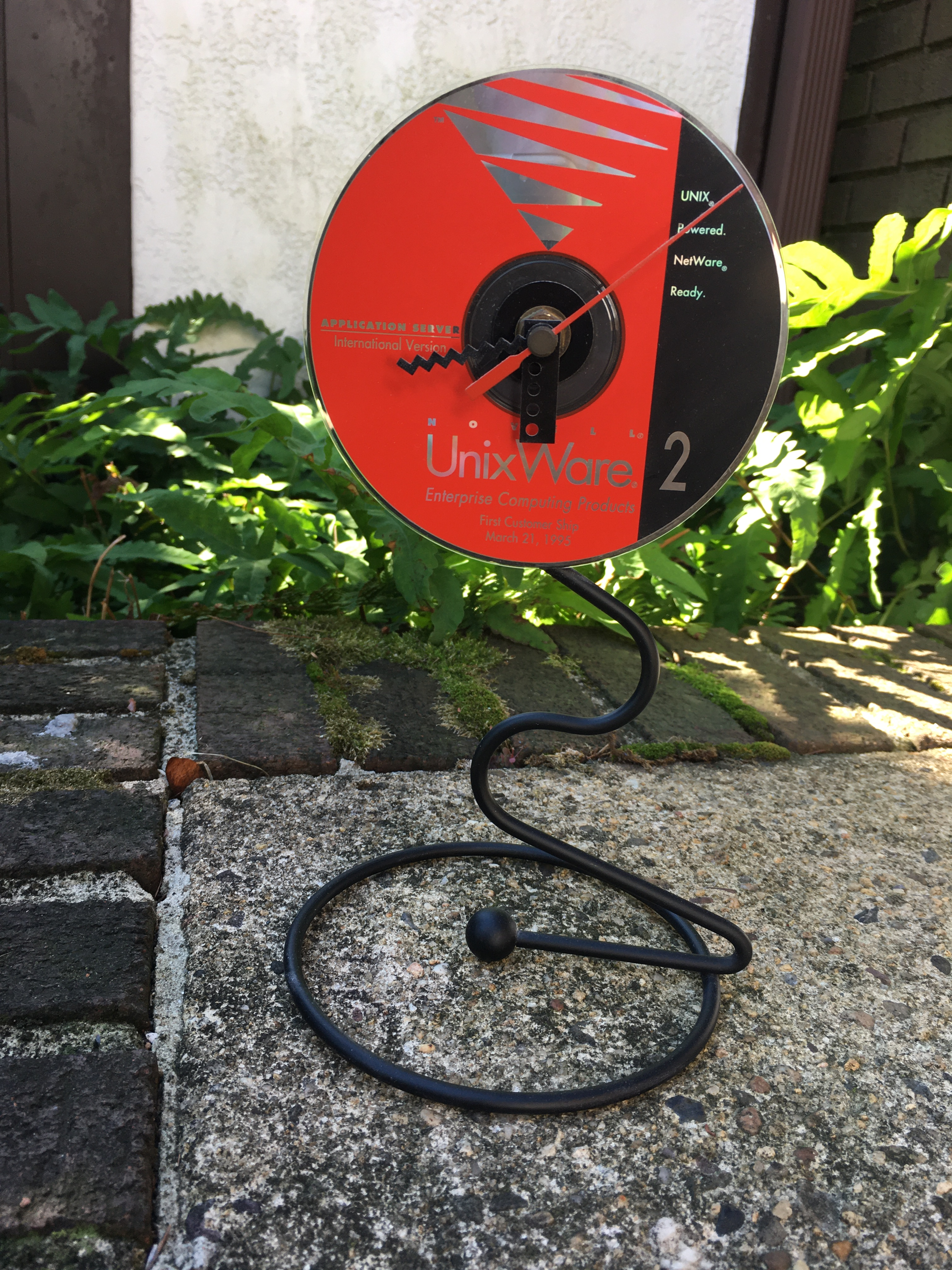
UnixWare 2 promotional clock

In 1994 Novell released UnixWare 1.1, which includes TCP/IP in both the personal and advanced server editions. The MOTIF 1.2 runtime libraries are included for COSE compliance. NUC (NetWare Unix Client) software is included for integration with Novell NetWare servers. The Advanced Merge application is installed on both the server and personal editions to allow running DOS and Windows 3.1 applications.

Novell later released bug-fix versions 1.1.1, 1.1.2, 1.1.3 and finally 1.1.4 on 19 June 1995.

UnixWare 2.0, based on the Unix System V release 4.2MP kernel, which added support for multiprocessing, began shipping to OEMs and developers in December 1994, and to the consumer market in March 1995. Both the personal and server editions support two processor systems, with the possibility of buying extra Processor Upgrade licenses for the server edition. Supported multiprocessor systems include standard Intel MP 1.1 SMP machines and Corollary C-bus systems. The system supports NetWare ODI network drivers in an effort to increase the number of supported network interfaces. Other new features in the release include a POSIX Threads library in addition to the older UI threads library.

Before SCO licensed UnixWare in 1995, Novell had also announced a project to create a "SuperNOS" based on NetWare 4.1 and UnixWare 2.0 technologies on top of ChorusOS in the future. This never materialized. Instead, a NetWare 4.10 server on Linux was offered as Caldera NetWare for Linux for OpenLinux since 1998, and Novell's Open Enterprise Server finally came in 2005.

=== 1995–2001: Santa Cruz Operation ===
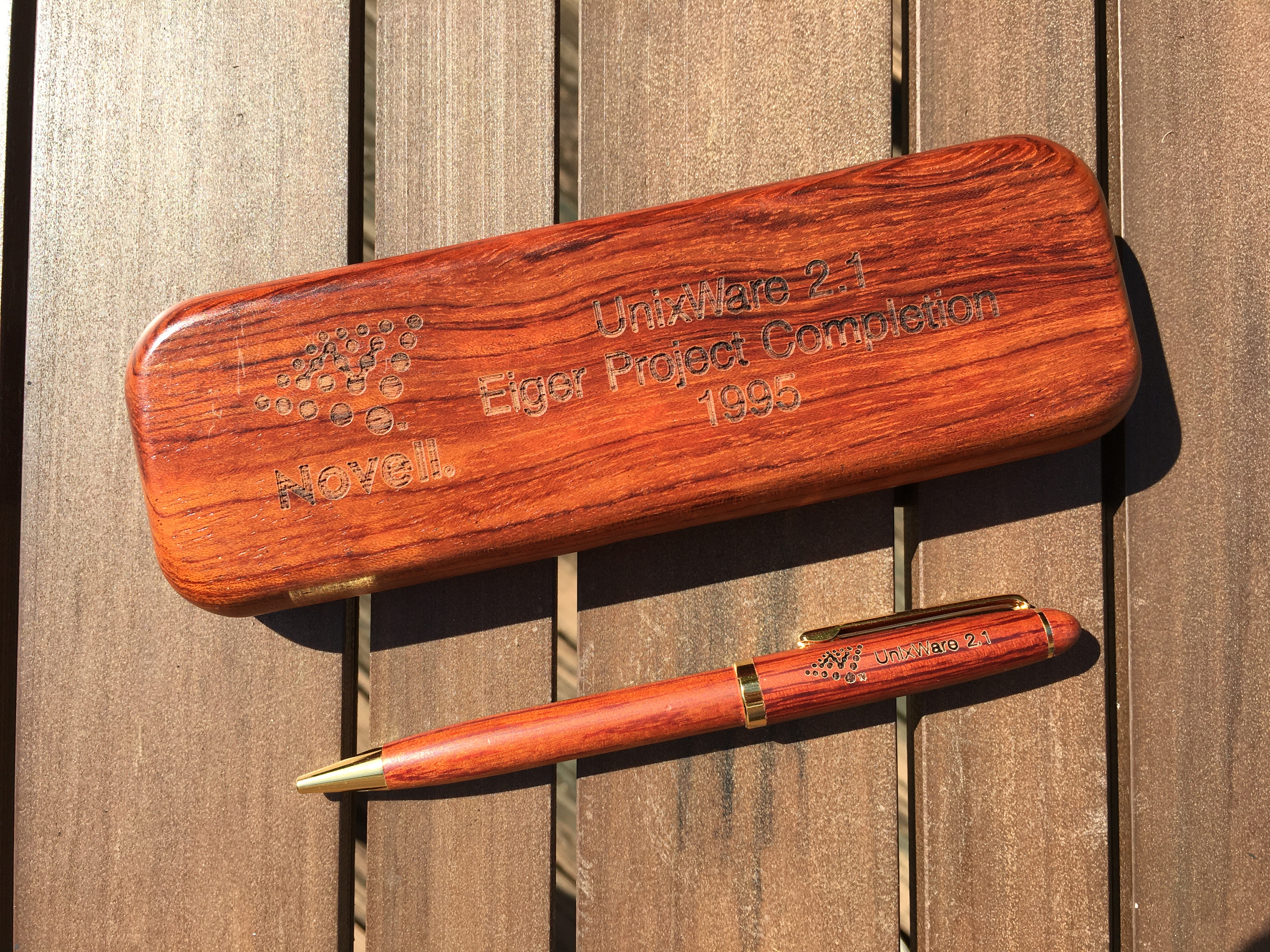
At the tail end of Novell's ownership of UnixWare, the company celebrated project completion of "Eiger", the codename for UnixWare 2.1

In 1995, the Santa Cruz Operation (SCO) acquired UnixWare from Novell. The exact terms of this transaction were disputed (see SCO vs Novell); courts have subsequently determined that Novell retained the ownership of Unix.

When the transfer was made public SCO announced that it would work towards merging UnixWare with its OpenServer SVR3.2 based OS, but the first release of UnixWare from SCO was version 2.1 in 1996. At the release of UnixWare 2.1 it was announced that the proposed UnixWare/OpenServer merger was known as project Gemini, to be available in 1997 and a 64-bit version of UnixWare was to be developed for 1998.

One controversial change was the adoption of an OpenServer-like user licensing policy. The Univel and Novell releases of UnixWare allow 2 users on the personal edition or unlimited numbers of users on the server edition. With UnixWare 2.1 the server edition includes a license for up to 5 users. Customers wanting more users could purchase 10, 25, 100, 500 or unlimited user license extensions.

SCO released three updates to UnixWare 2.1. UnixWare 2.1.1, released in 1996 achieved Unix 95 branding. UnixWare 2.1.2 and 2.1.3, available in 1998, are largely bug fix releases.

In 1998, Compaq released a package known as the Integrity XC consisting of a single-system image cluster of Proliant servers with a version of UnixWare 2.1, UnixWare NonStop Clusters.

The first results of the Gemini project were made available in early 1998 as UnixWare 7. SCO named the kernel version Unix System V release 5. The system is largely based on UnixWare 2.1, with features for driver compatibility with OpenServer, allowing use of OpenServer network drivers. System administration utilities from OpenServer, scoadmin, replace the original UnixWare sysadm utility. Major new features of UnixWare 7 include multi-path I/O, large files and file systems and support for large memory systems.

UnixWare 7 lacks the Xenix compatibility features of both its ancestors. This was due to SCO wishing to no longer pay Microsoft more royalties on Xenix. For those wanting Xenix compatibility, an optional SCO OpenServer Kernel Personality would later be created.

In 1999, SCO released the UnixWare 7.1 update which increased the number of editions; the Business (5-user), Department (25 user) and Enterprise (50 user) editions replace the earlier personal and server editions. The WebTop application from Tarantella, Inc. is included.

In 2000, SCO released the UnixWare 7.1.1 update; simultaneously, the UnixWare NonStop Clusters 7.1.1+IP single-system image cluster package was released. This new package allows commodity hardware to be used as well as the proprietary Compaq hardware supported by the earlier Integrity XC product, and was directly available from SCO.

=== 2000–2011: Caldera and The SCO Group ===
Old SCO UnixWare logo

On 2 August 2000, Santa Cruz Operation (SCO) announced that it would sell its Server Software and Services Divisions, as well as rights to the OpenServer and UnixWare products, to Caldera Systems. In March 2001, Caldera Systems announced they would become Caldera International (CII), and the SCO purchase was completed in May 2001. The remaining part of the Santa Cruz Operation company, the Tarantella Division, changed its name to Tarantella, Inc.

Caldera International's initial release of UnixWare was renamed Open UNIX 8. The name change was intended to highlight the addition of the "Linux Kernel Personality" compatibility layer to the operating system. This release is what would have been UnixWare 7.1.2. Caldera International renamed itself to The SCO Group in August 2002, after broadening its product line to include mobile products and services.

Later, the newly renamed The SCO Group reverted to the previous UnixWare brand and version release numbering, releasing UnixWare 7.1.3 and 7.1.4. No further releases were made under the Open UNIX name. The SCO Group continued to maintain UnixWare and issues periodic maintenance updates and support.

Between 2003 and the 2010s, The SCO Group engaged in a series of legal battles. In September 2007, The SCO Group filed for Chapter 11 bankruptcy protection.

On 11 April 2011, UnXis bought The SCO Group operating assets and intellectual property rights after having been approved by the bankruptcy court in Delaware. The SCO Group, Inc. then renamed itself TSG Group, Inc., and SCO Operations, Inc. became TSG Operations, Inc., and in August 2012 filed to convert from Chapter 11 to Chapter 7.

=== 2011–present: UnXis and Xinuos ===
The rights to UnixWare, as well as OpenServer, were acquired by UnXis in 2011. In June 2013, UnXis was renamed Xinuos and announced product and availability for SCO UnixWare 7.1.4+, now supporting both physical and virtual machines.

== Version history ==
Year	Release	Company	Codebase	Kernel version	Notes
1991	UnixWare 1.0	Univel	SVR4.2	1	
1993	UnixWare 1.1	Novell		1	
	UnixWare 1.1.1	Novell		1	
	UnixWare 1.1.2	Novell		1	
	UnixWare 1.1.3	Novell		1	
1995	UnixWare 2.0	Novell	SVR4.2MP	2.0	Support for SMP
	UnixWare 1.1.4	Novell		1	Final release of UnixWare 1
	UnixWare 2.0.1	Novell		2.0.1	
	UnixWare 2.0.2	Novell		2.0.2	July 1995
	UnixWare 2.0.3	Novell		2.0.3	November 1995
1996	UnixWare 2.1	Santa Cruz Operation		2.1	
	UnixWare 2.1.1	Santa Cruz Operation		2.1.1	
	UnixWare 2.1.2	Santa Cruz Operation		2.1.2	
1998	UnixWare 2.1.3	Santa Cruz Operation		2.1.3	Final release of UnixWare 2
1998	UnixWare 7	Santa Cruz Operation	SVR5	7.0.1	A "merge" of UnixWare 2 and OpenServer 5 (SCO UNIX)
	UnixWare 7.0.1	Santa Cruz Operation		7.0.1	
1999	UnixWare 7.1.0	Santa Cruz Operation		7.1.0	
2000	UnixWare 7.1.1	Santa Cruz Operation		7.1.1	
2001	Open UNIX 8	Caldera International		7.1.2	
2003	UnixWare 7.1.3	The SCO Group		7.1.3	See also Smallfoot (SVR6)
2004	UnixWare 7.1.4	The SCO Group		7.1.4	No longer included the Linux Kernel Personality
2004	UnixWare 7.1.4 MP1	The SCO Group		7.1.4	Maintenance pack 1
2005	UnixWare 7.1.4 MP2	The SCO Group		7.1.4	Maintenance pack 2
2006	UnixWare 7.1.4 MP3	The SCO Group		7.1.4	Maintenance pack 3
2008	UnixWare 7.1.4 MP4	The SCO Group		7.1.4	Maintenance pack 4
2013	UnixWare 7.1.4+	Xinuos		7.1.4	Virtualisation Support for VMware ESX
2015	UnixWare 7 Definitive	Xinuos		7.1.4+	Compatible with previous supported UnixWare versions
2017	UnixWare 7 Definitive 2018 (D2M1)	Xinuos		7.1.4+	In-place upgrade from previous supported versions
2022	UnixWare 7 Definitive 2018 (D2M1b)	Xinuos		7.1.4+	Enhance support for KVM and VirtualBox

== SCO Skunkware and open source ==
All versions of UnixWare have included significant open source components including BIND/X11/Sendmail/DHCP/Perl/Tcl and others. Later releases are bundled with numerous additional open source applications including Apache, Samba, MySQL, PostgreSQL, OpenSSH, and Mozilla software, as well as amenities such as Sudo, Vim, Tar, Gzip, and Red Hat's RPM Package Manager.

All versions of SCO operating system distributions including UnixWare also have an extensive set of open source packages available for free download via the SCO Skunkware site.

== See also ==
- OpenServer
- Portable NetWare
- Caldera OpenLinux
- Lineo Embedix
