= Comparison of X window managers =

This article compares variety of different X window managers. For an introduction to the topic, see X Window System.

== General information ==
Name	Type	Language	Initial release	Latest release		License	Memory (MB)
Name	Type	Language	Initial release	Version	Date	License	Memory (MB)
9wm	Stacking	C	1994	1.4.2	2022-01-19	MIT	0.4
aewm	Stacking	C	1999	1.3.12	2007-12-27	MIT	
awesome	Dynamic	C, Lua	2007-09-18	4.3	2019-01-28	GPL-2.0-or-later	9
Berry	Stacking	C	2018-08-24	0.1.13	2025-06-22	MIT	
Blackbox	Stacking	C++	1997	0.77	2021-05-12	MIT	3
bspwm	Tiling	C	2013-04-23	0.9.12	2025-10-08	BSD-2-clause	
Compiz	Compositing	C (OpenGL)	2006	0.9.14.2	2022-08-22	MIT	
CTWM	Stacking	C	1992	4.1.0	2023-03-26	MIT	
cwm	Stacking	C	2004-07-10	3	2005-08-28	ISC	8
dkwm	Dynamic	C	2019-12-01	1.9-1	2023-06-18	MIT/X	
dwm	Dynamic	C	2006-07-14	6.8	2026-01-30	MIT	1
Enlightenment	Compositing	C	1997	0.27.1	2025-03-14	BSD-2-clause	
Enlightenment 16	Compositing	C	1999-10-10	1.0.31	2025-08-10	MIT with advertising clause	
evilwm	Stacking	C	2000	1.5	2025-12-19	aewm/9wm	
EXWM	Tiling	Emacs Lisp	2018	0.35	2026-06-28	GPL-3.0-or-later	
Fluxbox	Stacking	C++	2001-09-12	1.3.7	2015-02-08	MIT	16
FLWM	Stacking	C++ (FLTK)	1998	1.02	2006-06-30	GPL-2.0-or-later	
FVWM	Stacking	C	1993-06-01	1.1.4	2025-11-09	GPL-2.0-or-later	4
herbstluftwm	Dynamic	C++	2011-10-02	0.9.6	2026-04-03	BSD-2-clause	
i3	Dynamic	C	2009-03-15	4.25.1	2026-02-06	BSD-3-clause	3
IceWM	Stacking	C++	1997	4.1.0	2026-08-06	LGPL-2.0-only	4.5
Ion	Tiling	C, Lua	2000	Final	2009-01-10	LGPL-2.1-only (Note: LGPL-2.1-only with naming restrictions on modified versions.)	
JWM (Joe's Window Manager)	Stacking	C	2003	2.4.6	2024-11-09	MIT	3
KWin (KDE)	Compositing	C++ (Qt)	2002	6.7.90	2026-09-10	GPL	41
LeftWM	Tiling	Rust	2019	0.5.3	2024-10-20	MIT	
Matchbox	Stacking	C	2007-04-13	1.2.3	2023-03-15	GPL-2.0-or-later	
Metacity (GNOME 2/LiMo)	Compositing	C, C++ (GTK+)	2002-10	3.56.0	2025-04-26	GPL-2.0-or-later	
Moksha (E17)	Compositing	C	2015-08-11	0.4.1	2023-08-28		
Motif Window Manager (mwm)	Stacking	C	1989	2.3.8	2017-12-05	LGPL-2.1-or-later	
Mutter (GNOME 3+/MeeGo)	Compositing	C (Clutter)	2011-04	50.4	2026-08-04	GPL-2.0-or-later	18.6
Openbox	Stacking	C	2002-09-18	3.6.1	2015-07-01	GPL-2.0-or-later	7
PekWM	Stacking	C++	2009	0.4.4	2026-04-06	GPL-2.0-or-later	5.3
PlayWM	Stacking	C	2013-31-01	Final	2013-02-10	GPL	
Qtile	Dynamic	Python	2008-08-31	0.37.1	2026-09-20	MIT	2
Ragnar	Tiling	C	2023-05-15	1.5.0	2024-08-17	GPL	
Ratpoison	Tiling	C	2000-12-04	1.4.9	2017-04-04	GPL-2.0-or-later	1
Sawfish	Stacking	Lisp, C	2000-01-01	1.13.0	2021-12-24	GPL-2.0-or-later	3.1
SithWM	Stacking	C	2007	1.2.3	2008-04-25	GPL	
spectrwm	Dynamic	C	2012-02-07	3.7.0	2025-08-27	ISC	
steamcompmgr	Compositing	C	2013			BSD-2-clause	
StumpWM	Tiling	Common Lisp	2017-01-12	24.11	2024-11-29	GPL-2.0-or-later	
sxwm	Dynamic	C	2025	1.6	2025-06-26	GPL-3.0-or-later	
twm	Stacking	C	1987	1.0.13.1	2025-05-06	MIT-open-group; MIT-CMU; XFree86-1.0	1.2
Ultrix Window Manager (uwm)	Stacking	C	1985	Final	1988-10-27	Similar to BSD licenses	
Window Maker	Stacking	C	1997	0.96.0	2023-08-05	GPL-2.0-or-later	7
Wingo	Dynamic	Go	2012	Final	2018	WTFPL	
wmii	Dynamic	C	2005-06-01	3.9.2	2010-06-10	MIT	
Xfwm (Xfce)	Compositing	C (GTK+)	1996	4.20.0	2024-12-15	GPL, LGPL	70
xmonad	Dynamic	Haskell	2007-03-06	0.18.1	2026-03-07	BSD-3-clause	2
worm	Dynamic	Nim	2021-12-12	0.3.3	2024-03-30	MIT	
Name	Type	Language	Initial release	Latest release		License	Memory (MB)
Name	Type	Language	Initial release	Version	Date	License	Memory (MB)

== Features ==
Name	Configurable titlebar buttons	Graphical configuration	Hotkeys	ICCCM/EWMH compliant	Panel for window switching	Tabbed windows	Themeable
9wm	No	No	No		Yes	No	No
aewm	No	No	No	Yes	Yes	No	No
awesome	Yes	No	Yes	Yes	Yes	No	Yes
Berry	No	Yes (Note: Via CLI client.)	Yes (Note: Via CLI client and third party (e.g. sxhkd).)	No	No	No	Yes
Blackbox	No	Depends (Note: Via third party.)	Depends (Note: With bbkeys.)	Yes (Note: Through 0.65 / from 0.70.)	Yes	No	Yes
bspwm	No	No	Yes (Note: With sxhkd.)	Partial	No	No	No
Compiz	Yes	Yes	Yes	Yes	Depends	Yes	Yes
CTWM	Yes			Partial	Yes		Yes
cwm	no titlebar buttons	No	Yes		No	No	Yes
dkwm							
dwm	no titlebar buttons	No	Yes		Yes	No	Yes
Enlightenment	Yes	Yes	Yes	Yes	Yes	No	Yes
evilwm	no titlebar buttons	No	Yes	Partial	No	No	Yes
EXWM	No	No	Yes	Partial	No	Depends	Yes
Fluxbox	Yes	Depends	Yes	Yes	Yes	Yes	Yes
FLWM		No	Yes		No (Note: There is a window list menu.)	No	No
FVWM	Yes	No	Yes	Yes	Yes	Yes	Depends
herbstluftwm	no titlebar buttons	No	Yes	Yes	No	Yes	Yes
i3	no titlebar buttons	No	Yes	Yes	No	Yes	Yes
IceWM	Yes	Depends	Yes	Yes	Yes	Yes	Yes
Ion	no titlebar buttons	No	Yes		No	Yes	Yes
JWM	Yes	Depends	Yes	EWMH	Yes	No	Yes
KWin (KDE)	Yes	Yes	Yes	Yes	Yes	Yes	Yes
LeftWM							
Matchbox				EWMH compliance	No	No	Yes
Metacity (GNOME)	Yes	Yes	Yes	Yes	Yes	No	Yes
Mutter (GNOME/MeeGo)	Yes	Yes	Yes	Yes	Gnome Shell	No	Yes
Moody							
Motif Window Manager (mwm)	No	No	Yes				No (Note: Can change colours.)
Openbox	Yes	Depends	Yes	Yes	Depends	No	Yes
PekWM	Yes	No	Yes	Partial	No	Yes	Yes
PlayWM	Yes	No	Yes	Yes	Yes	No	Yes
Qtile	Yes	No	Yes	Yes		Yes	Yes
Ragnar							
Ratpoison	No	No	Yes	No	No	No	No
Sawfish	Yes	Yes	Yes	Partial	Yes	primitive	Yes
SithWM	no titlebar buttons	No	Yes		No	No	Yes
spectrwm	no titlebar buttons	No	Yes	Yes	No	No	solid colors
steamcompmgr	No	No	Yes		No	No	No
StumpWM	No	No	Yes	No	No	No	No
sxwm	No	No	Yes		Yes	No	Yes
twm	Yes	No	Yes		Yes	No	solid colors
uwm							
Window Maker	No	Yes	Yes	Partial	Yes	Yes	Yes
Wingo	Yes	No	Yes	Yes	Yes	No	Yes
WMFS	Yes	No	Yes	Yes	Yes	Yes	Yes
wmii	Yes	No	Yes	Yes	No	Yes	Yes
Xfwm (Xfce)	Yes	Yes	Yes	Yes	Yes	No	Yes
xmonad	Yes	No	Yes	Yes / ?	Depends	Yes	Yes
worm							
Name	Configurable titlebar buttons	Graphical configuration	Hotkeys	ICCCM/EWMH compliant	Panel for window switching	Tabbed windows	Themeable

== See also ==
- Comparison of X Window System desktop environments
- Window manager
- List of Wayland compositors
