= PekWM =

PekWM is a minimalist window manager. It provides an application menu and window decorations. Other features include the likes of window grouping, xinerama support, automatic properties, and a keygrabber with keychains. PekWM is developed by Claes Nästen and is originally based on the code base of aewm++ but has since then diverged from it. PekWM is suitable to be used as a technical foundation for the user of a computer to build a customized environment around. PekWM is very customizable and has good system performance. PekWM is made for the X windowing system (X11). PekWM is primarily designed for use on operating systems featuring the Linux kernel, and is available in the repositories for many such system distributions.

Memory usage rankings of tested window managers and desktop environments according to one source
GUI name	memory usage (MB)
dwm	250
flwm	260
pekwm	280
fvwm2	330
wmaker	370
icewm	380
fluxbox	390
openbox	410
MATE	520
Plasma	680

== See also ==
- Comparison of X window managers
- Comparison of X Window System desktop environments
