= Ion (window manager) =

Tiling and tabbing window manager

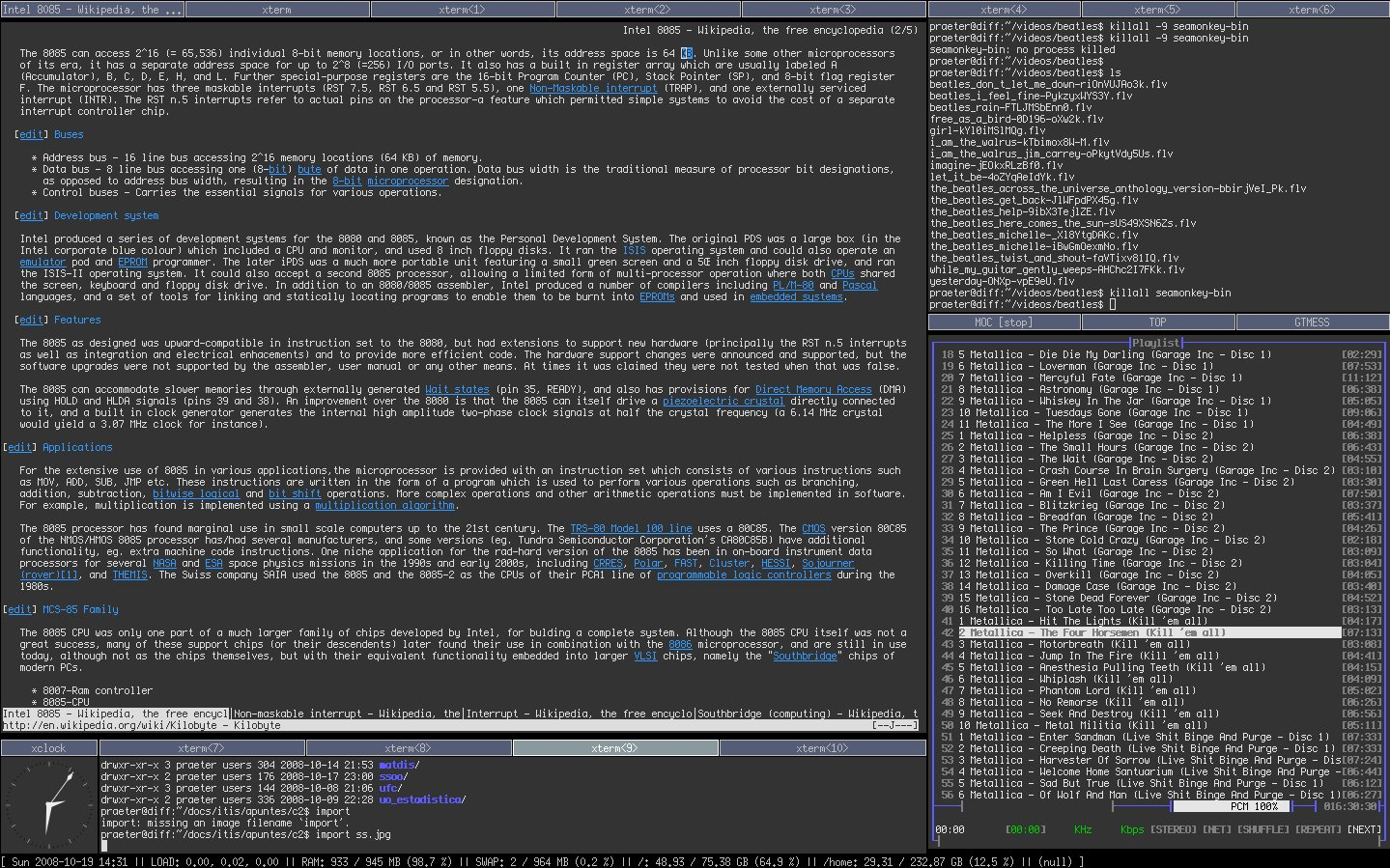
- Ion in use
- Developer: Tuomo Valkonen
- Operating system: Unix-like
- Type: Window Manager
- License: LGPL-2.1-only with naming restrictions
- Website: tuomov.iki.fi/software/ion/

In Unix computing, Ion is a tiling and tabbing window manager for the X Window System. It is designed such that it is possible to manage windows using only a keyboard, without needing a mouse. It is the successor of PWM and is written by the same author, Tuomo Valkonen. Since the first release of Ion in the summer 2000, similar alternative window management ideas have begun to show in other new window managers: Larswm, ratpoison, StumpWM, wmii, xmonad and dwm.

First versions of Ion were released under the Artistic License, Ion2 and the development versions of Ion3 were released under the GNU Lesser General Public License (LGPL). However, the first release candidate of Ion3 included a license change to a custom license based on the LGPL (specifically modified versions must not use the name ion).

Since version 2, Ion has been scriptable in Lua.

As of September 17, 2009, Valkonen states he is unlikely to continue development of Ion by himself.

The official home page went offline in early 2010.

A fork, Notion (Not-ion), is being maintained.

== Alternatives ==
The Notion (Not-ion) fork is actively maintained with packages available for the Linux distributions gentoo, Debian, Arch, SUSE and Fedora as well as NetBSD and Solaris (Solaris 10, OpenSolaris and OpenIndiana).

The Ion/WL (Ion for Wayland) compositor has been created to closely follow Ion3's behavior, using Python instead of Lua for its scripting language.

Window managers similar to ion include awesome, dwm, i3, larswm, and xmonad.

== Controversy ==
Tuomo Valkonen, the author of Ion, has been at the center of several controversies concerning the licensing and distribution of his software, in particular the proclivity of major Linux and BSD distributions of making outdated development versions of Ion3 (the current unstable development branch) available as part of "frozen" software repositories. Often, such versions will include patches, such as for Xinerama or Xft support, both of which Valkonen disapproves on professional and personal grounds and has had removed from the main source tree. Yet, such distribution would seem to imply that the patched version is the official Ion3 package maintained by Valkonen himself, which he sees as unacceptable. Valkonen has even recently become an outspoken critic of the entire free software and open-source movement (the "FOSS herd", as he refers to it) due to his perceived mistreatment at the hands of several major distributions, including Arch Linux, Debian, pkgsrc (NetBSD, DragonflyBSD), and FreeBSD.

On April 28, 2007, Valkonen warned the Arch Linux maintainers of possible legal action because the (unofficial) Arch User Repository contained scripts to install Ion3 with patches he did not approve of. Later on he did the same with the pkgsrc maintainer of the NetBSD project and the ports maintainer of the FreeBSD project. As of December 12, 2007, the development branch of Ion, along with other software by Valkonen, was pulled from the FreeBSD ports tree, after the author filed a complaint about outdated development releases still being available. Any version of Ion may still be installed from source code on any Unix system with proper libraries and dependencies.

Valkonen has implied in several mailing lists that he has become completely disillusioned with, if not openly hostile toward, the free software community in general. He plans to switch to developing strictly closed-source software for the Windows platform in the future. As of 2018, the author claims to have "found more worthwhile hobbies" than programming for the "Free Software movement", opining that it amounts to "bug-ridden clone[s] ... with a centralised software distribution mechanism". Borgend, Valkonen's latest published program as of 2018, remains open-source and is compatible with Unix-like systems, including Macintosh OS X, his present operating system of choice.

== See also ==
- Integrated development environment
- Multiple-document interface
- Tabbed-document interface
- Tiling window manager
