= Rat poison (disambiguation) =

Rat poison is a pest control chemical for killing rodents.

Rat poison may also refer to:

- ratpoison, a computer program
- Rat Poison, a remix of "Poison" (The Prodigy song)
