= ArchOne =

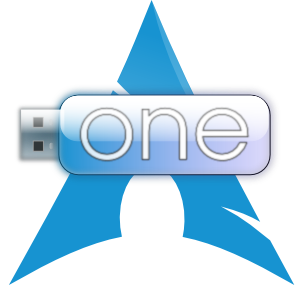

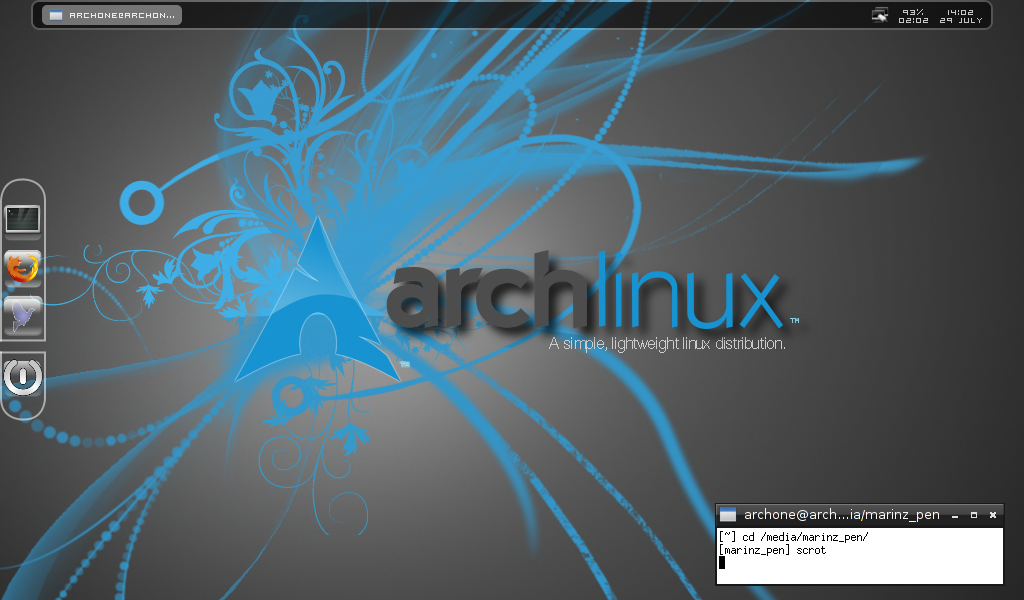
- Developer: archone.sourceforge.net
- OS family: Linux (Unix-like)
- Source model: Open source
- Latest release: 2010.08
- Available in: English
- Update method: Pacman
- Package manager: Pacman
- Kernel type: Monolithic (Linux)
- Default user interface: OpenBox
- License: Various
- Official website: archone.sourceforge.net

ArchOne is an Arch Linux based operating system, optimized for Acer Aspire One netbooks, but usable on other PCs with similar hardware.

== Features ==
ArchOne is preconfigured to support the hardware of the Acer Aspire One. Drivers for network, sound, graphics, special keys and the webcam are active and make the hardware ready to use immediately upon first boot.

ArchOne uses a rolling-release model for upgrades.

== Edition ==
ArchOne has three versions, each with a different desktop manager: Openbox edition, GNOME edition and the KDE edition., but with the same application software, including Firefox, Google Chrome, Skype, KeePassX, Hsoconnect, Gparted, GIMP, OpenOffice.org, VLC, MPlayer.
