= Sway (window manager) =

Tiling Wayland compositor

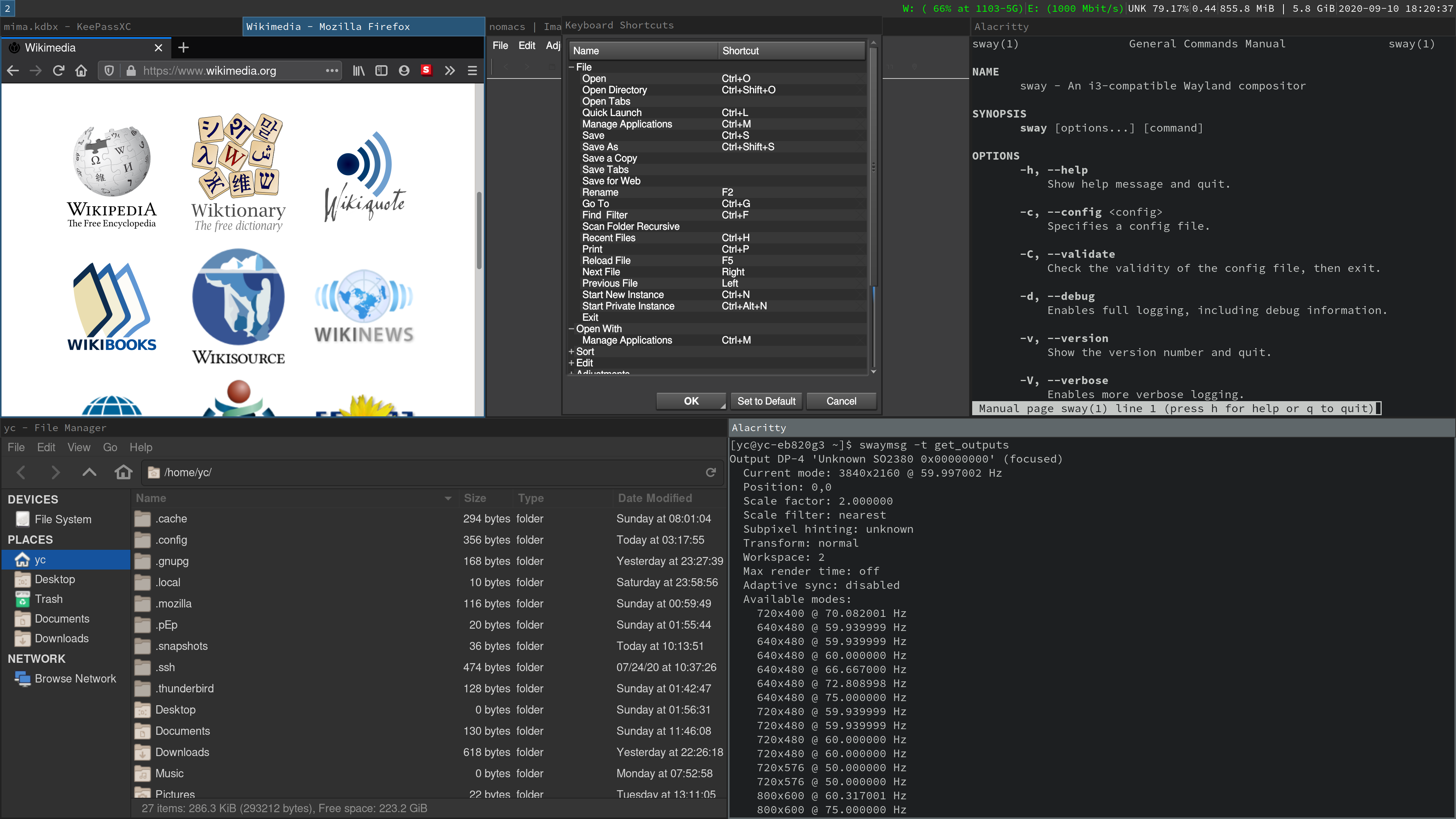
- Original author: Drew DeVault (SirCmpwn)
- Release: March 24, 2016; 10 years ago
- Stable release: 1.12 / 25 May 2026; 5 months ago
- Written in: C
- Operating system: Unix-like
- Size: 5.33 MiB
- Type: Window manager
- License: MIT License
- Website: swaywm.org
- Repository: github.com/swaywm/sway

Sway is a tiling window manager and Wayland compositor, inspired by i3, and written in C. Sway is designed as a drop-in replacement for i3 using the Wayland display server protocol and wlroots compositor library. Sway works with existing i3 configuration files and supports most of i3's features while providing several new features of its own.

In April 2023, an official Fedora Sway spin released with Fedora 38.
