= I3 (window manager) =

Unix window manager software

i3

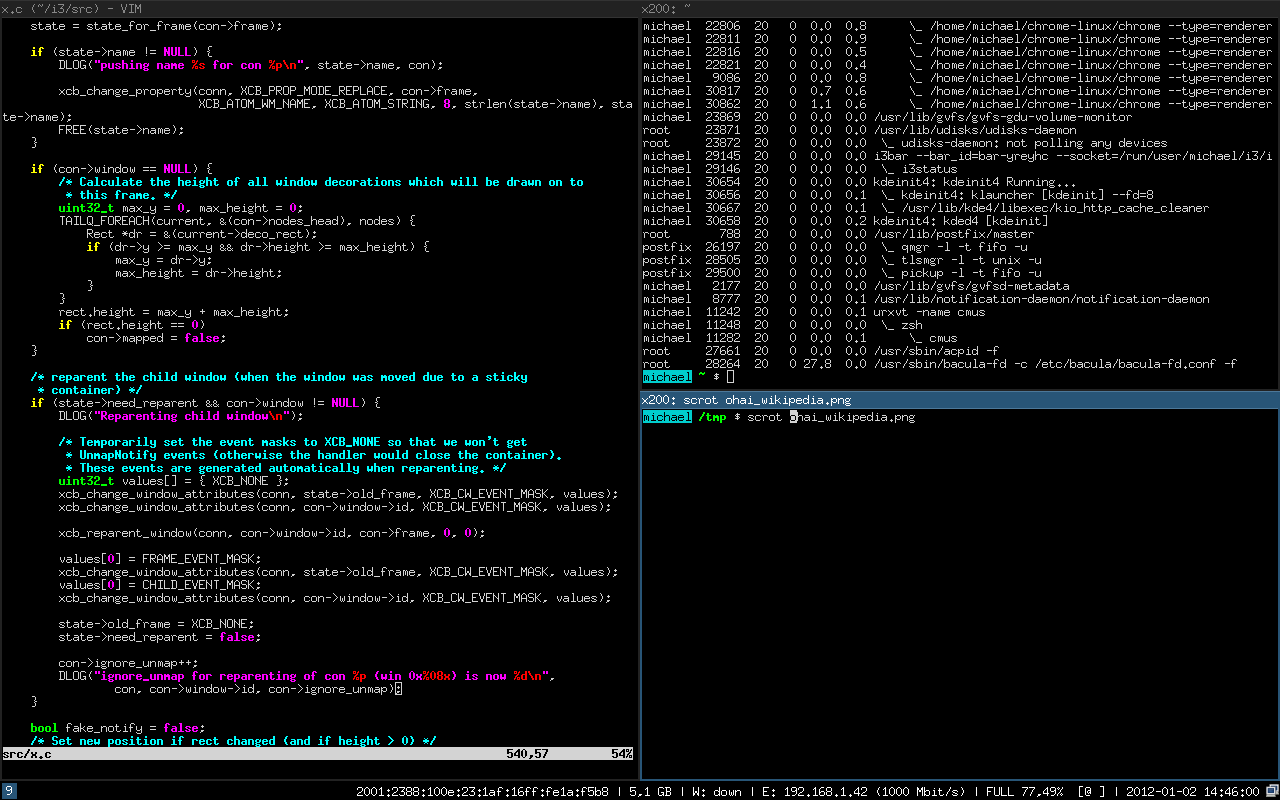
- i3 with vim and terminals open
- Original author: Michael Stapelberg
- Release: 15 March 2009; 17 years ago
- Stable release: 4.25.1 / 6 February 2026; 6 months ago
- Written in: C
- Operating system: Unix-like
- Size: 1.3 MiB
- Type: Window manager
- License: BSD-3-Clause
- Website: i3wm.org
- Repository: github.com/i3/i3

i3 is a tiling window manager designed for X11, inspired by wmii and written in C. It supports tiling, stacking, and tabbing layouts, which are handled manually. Its configuration is achieved via a plain text file and extending i3 is possible using its Unix domain socket and JSON based IPC interface from many programming languages.

Like wmii, i3 uses a control system very similar to that of vi and Vim. By default, window focus is controlled by what the documentation refers to as the 'Mod1' key (Alt key/Windows key) in addition to the right-hand home row keys (Mod1+J,K,L,Semicolon), while window movement is controlled by the addition of the Shift key (Mod1+Shift+J,K,L,Semicolon).

== Design goals ==
i3's primary design goals are to possess well-written, documented code that encourages user contribution; to use XCB instead of Xlib; to implement multi-monitor features correctly, so that each workspace is assigned to a virtual screen, and monitor additions and removals are non-destructive of windows; to implement different modes, in a manner similar to that of the text editors vi and vim; to use a tree as the abstraction (and underlying data structure) for window management; and to implement UTF-8 character encoding.

== Features ==
i3's configuration is done via a plain text file (usually found in ~/.config/i3/config), (Note: In Unix filesystems, "~" refers to the user's home directory.) which can be customized without any sophisticated programming knowledge. Contrary to other popular tiling window managers, such as dwm, awesome, and xmonad, window management is left to the user in i3. Windows are held inside containers, which can be split vertically or horizontally. They can also optionally be resized. There are also options for stacking the windows, as well as tabbing them (similar to the interface that web browsers use). i3 uses dmenu as the default program launcher, but it can be replaced. i3 also has an associated program called i3bar that displays information about the system at the bottom of the screen.

i3 also supports the use of multiple monitors.

=== Floating pop-up windows ===
Even though i3 is a tiling window manager, specific windows, such as password pop-ups, are not displayed as new tiles by default; they are always stacked in front of tiled windows, unless in full screen mode. These floating windows can be moved and resized freely, just as they can in stacking window managers and popular desktop environments like GNOME or KDE Plasma.

The authors of i3 intend floating windows to be used for pop-up windows only.

== Gallery ==
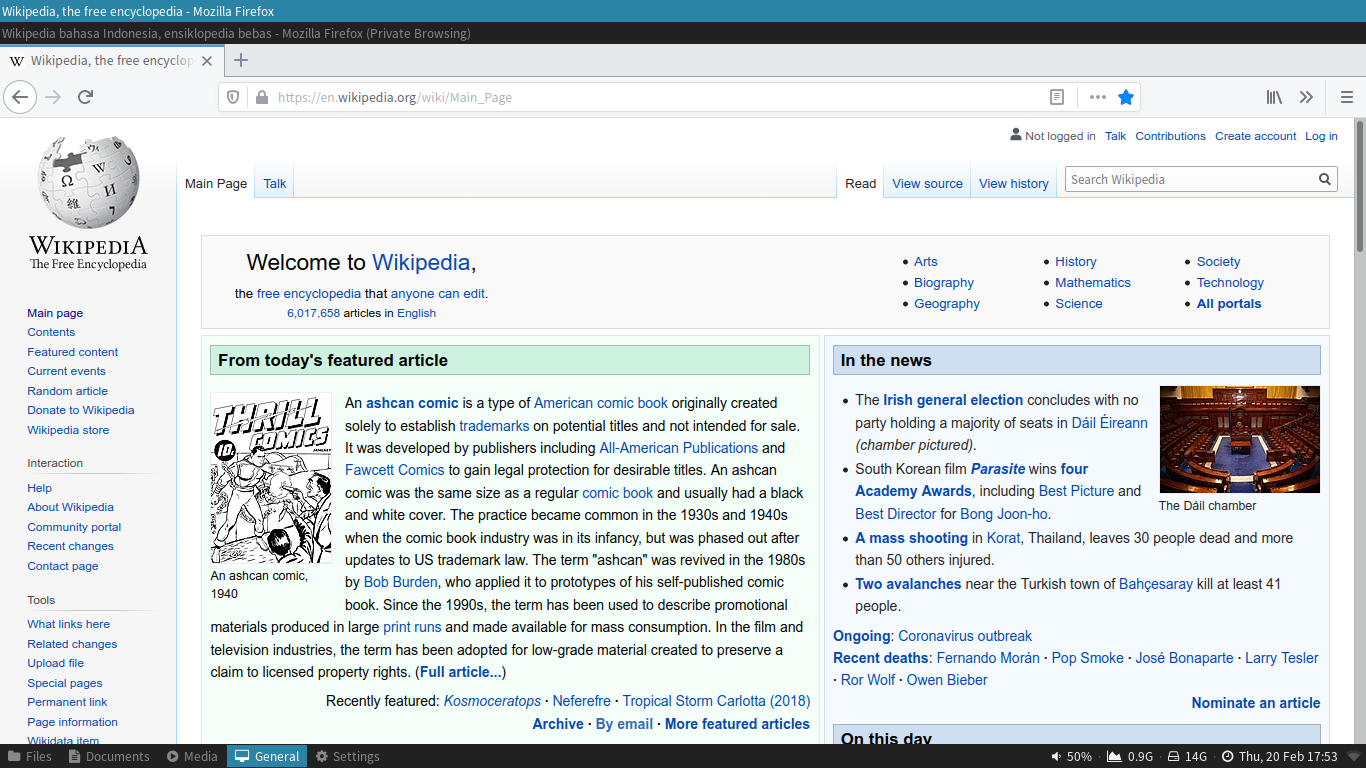
i3 with stacked layout

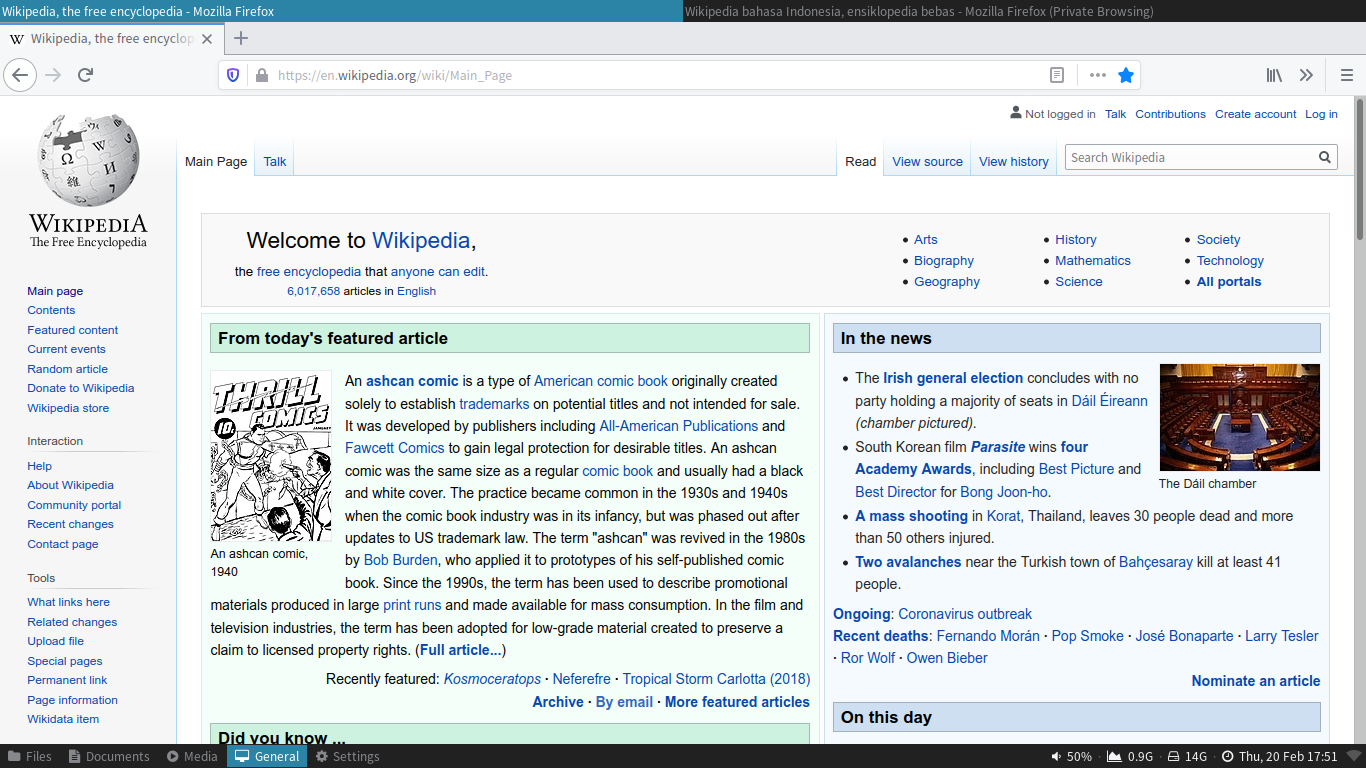
i3 with tabbed layout

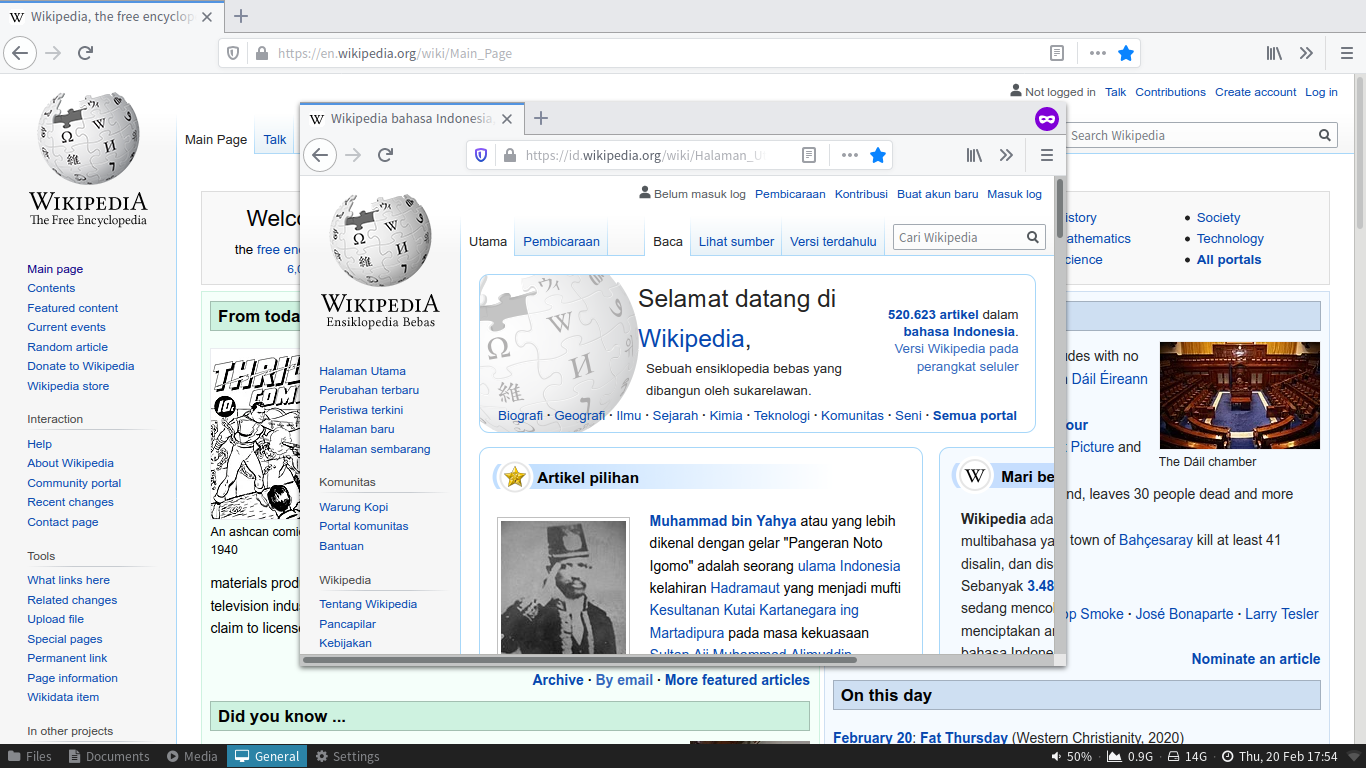
i3 with floating window

== See also ==
- Comparison of X window managers
- Sway – Window manager for Wayland that is similar to i3
