= Amiwm =

Stacking window manager for X window system

- Developer: Marcus Comstedt
- Stable release: 0.22pl2 / 16 April 2023
- Type: Window manager
- License: Source Available (Note: Source code available. The source code can be distributed unmodified for non-commercial purposes only. Modified source code cannot be distributed without the author's prior consent, but patches against the unmodified source code can be distributed.)
- Website: https://www.lysator.liu.se/~marcus/amiwm.html

In computing, the AMIga Window Manager (amiwm) is a stacking window manager for the X Window System written by Marcus Comstedt.

The window manager emulates the Amiga Workbench and includes support for multiple virtual screens like the AmigaOS, but doesn't offer more functionality than standard Workbench. By the words of its author, "the purpose of amiwm is to make life more pleasant for Amiga-freaks like myself who has/wants to use UNIX workstations once in a while". AmiWM was not updated for years since the 1998 release, yet Linux Format magazine rated it as fast and reliable in 2007. Although Marcus Comstedt included new features like support for AmigaOS 3.5 icons during internal development, a new version was not released until 2010.

== Features ==
Features of the amiwm window manager include:

- Supports iconification of running tasks
- Window borders
- Window titlebars
- Titlebar buttons for menu, minimize, maximize, and close
- Desktop shortcuts
