= Tiling window manager =

Window manager with non-overlapping frames

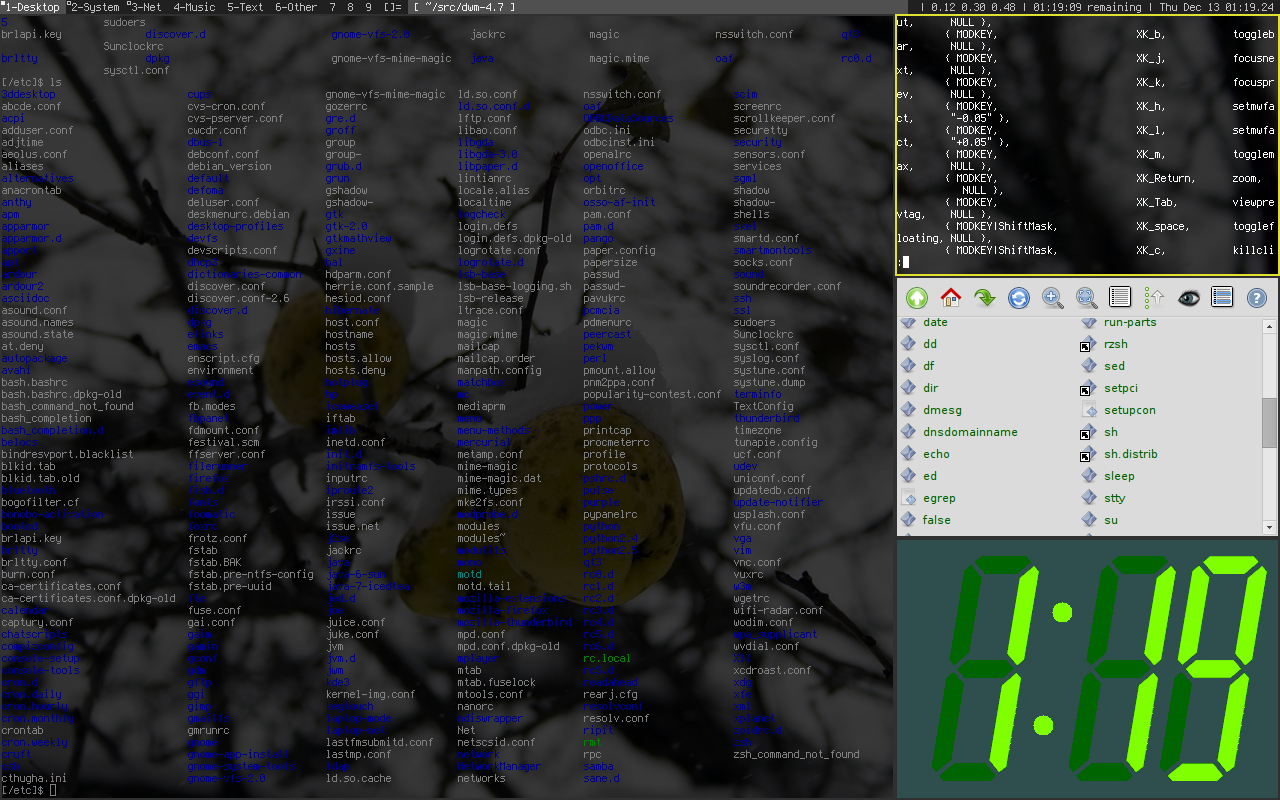
The dwm window manager with the screen divided into four tiles

In computing, a tiling window manager is a window manager with the organization of the screen often dependent on mathematical formulas to organise the windows into a non-overlapping frame. This is opposed to the more common approach used by stacking window managers, which allow the user to drag windows around, instead of windows snapping into a position. This allows for a different style of organization, although it departs from the traditional desktop metaphor.

== History ==
=== Xerox PARC ===
The first Xerox Star system (released in 1981) tiled application windows, but allowed dialog boxes and property windows to overlap. Later, Xerox PARC also developed CEDAR (released in 1982), the first windowing system using a tiled window manager.

=== Various vendors ===
Next in 1983 came Andrew WM, a complete tiled windowing system later replaced by X11. Microsoft's Windows 1.0 (released in 1985) also used tiling (see sections below). In 1986 came Digital Research's GEM 2.0, a windowing system for the CP/M which used tiling by default. One of the early (created in 1988) tiling WMs was Siemens' RTL, up to today a textbook example because of its algorithms of automated window scaling, placement, and arrangement, and (de)iconification. RTL ran on X11R2 and R3, mainly on the "native" Siemens systems, e.g., SINIX. Its features are described by its promotional video. The Andrew Project (AP or tAP) was a desktop client system (like early GNOME) for X with a tiling and overlapping window manager.

MacOS X 10.11 El Capitan released in September 2015 introduces new window management features such as creating a full-screen split view limited to two app windows side-by-side in full screen by holding down the full-screen button in the upper-left corner of a window.

== Dynamic window manager ==
In computing, a dynamic window manager is a tiling window manager where windows are tiled based on preset layouts between which the user can switch. Layouts typically have a main area and a secondary area. The main area usually shows one window, but one can also change the number of windows in this area. Its purpose is to reserve more space for the more important window(s). The secondary area shows the other windows. Tiling window managers that don't use layouts are called manual tiling window managers. They let the user decide where windows should be placed.

== Tiling window managers ==
=== Microsoft Windows ===
Tile Vertically or Show Windows Side by Side

Tile Horizontally or Show Windows Stacked

The first version (Windows 1.0) featured a tiling window manager, partly because of litigation by Apple claiming ownership of the overlapping window desktop metaphor. But due to complaints, the next version (Windows 2.0) followed the desktop metaphor. All later versions of the operating system stuck to this approach as the default behaviour.

The built-in Microsoft Windows window manager has, since Windows 2.0, followed the traditional stacking approach by default. It can also act as a rudimentary tiling window manager.

To tile windows, the user selects them in the taskbar and uses the context menu choice Tile Vertically or Tile Horizontally. Choosing Tile Vertically will cause the windows to tile horizontally but take on a vertical shape, while choosing Tile Horizontally will cause the windows to tile vertically but take on a horizontal shape. These options were later changed in Windows Vista to Show Windows Side by Side and Show Windows Stacked, respectively.

Windows 7 added "Aero Snap" which adds the ability to drag windows to either side of the screen to create a simple side-by-side tiled layout, or to the top of the screen to maximize. Windows 8 introduced Windows Store apps; unlike desktop applications, they did not operate in a window, and could only run in full screen, or "snapped" as a sidebar alongside another app, or the desktop environment.

Along with allowing Windows Store apps to run in a traditional window, Windows 10 enhanced the snapping features introduced in Windows 7 by allowing windows to be tiled into screen quadrants by dragging them to the corner, and adding "Snap Assist" — which prompts the user to select the application they want to occupy the other half of the screen when they snap a window to one half of the screen, and allows the user to automatically resize both windows at once by dragging a handle in the center of the screen.

Windows 10 also supports FancyZones, a more complete tiling window manager facility allowing customized tiling zones and greater user control, configured through Microsoft PowerToys.

Windows 11 added more built-in tiling options, activated by hovering the mouse pointer over the maximize button.

==== 3rd-party replacements ====
- Amethyst for windows — dynamic window manager along the lines of amethyst for MacOS.
- AquaSnap — made by Nurgo Software. Freeware, with an optional "Professional" license.
- bug.n – open source, configurable tiling window manager built as an AutoHotKey script and licensed under the GNU GPL.
- dwm-win32 — port of dwm's general functionality to win32. Is MIT-licensed and is configured by editing a config header in the same style as dwm.
- GlazeWM — a tiling window manager for Windows inspired by i3 and Polybar.
- Komorebi — a window manager for Microsoft Windows SO written in Rust. Like bspwm it does not handle key-binding on its own, so users have to use AHK or WHKD to manage the shortcuts. Komorebi also has a GUI User Friendly version called Komorebi UI.
- MaxTo — customizable grid, global hotkeys. Works with elevated applications, 32-bit and 64-bit applications, and multiple monitors.
- Plumb — lightweight tiling manager with support for multiple versions of Windows. Supports HiDPI monitors, keyboard hotkeys, and customization of hotkeys (XAML).
- Stack – customizable grid (XAML), global hotkeys and/or middle mouse button. Supports HiDPI and multiple monitors.
- Whim — dynamic window manager that is built using WinUI 3 and the .NET framework.
- workspacer — an MIT-licensed tiling window manager for Windows 10 that aims to be fast and compatible. Written and configurable using C#.
- WS Grid+ – move and/or resize window's using a grid selection system combining benefits of floating, stacking, and tiling. It provides keyboard/mouse shortcuts to instantly move and resize a window.

=== X Window System ===
In the X Window System, the window manager is a separate program. X itself enforces no specific window management approach and remains usable even without any window manager. Current X protocol version X11 explicitly mentions the possibility of tiling window managers. The Siemens RTL Tiled Window Manager (released in 1988) was the first to implement automatic placement/sizing strategies. Another tiling window manager from this period was the Cambridge Window Manager developed by IBM's Academic Information System group.

In 2000, both larswm and Ion released a first version.

==== List of tiling window managers for X ====
- awesome – a dwm derivative with dynamic window tiling, floating, and tagging, written in C and configurable and extensible in Lua. It was the first WM to be ported from Xlib to XCB, and supports D-Bus, pango, XRandR, and Xinerama.
- bspwm – a small tiling window manager that represents windows as the leaves of a full binary tree. It does not handle key-binds on its own, requiring another program (e.g. sxhkd) to translate input to X events.
- Compiz – a compositing window manager available for usage without leaving familiar interfaces such as the ones from GNOME, KDE Plasma or Mate. One of its plugins (called Grid) allows the user to configure several keybindings to move windows to any corner, with five different lengths. There are also options to configure default placement for specific windows. The plugins can be configured through the Compiz Config Settings Manager / CCSM.
- dwm – allows for switching tiling layouts by clicking a textual ASCII art 'icon' in the status bar. The default is a main area + stacking area arrangement, represented by a []= character glyph. Other standard layouts are a single-window "monocle" mode represented by an M and a non-tiling floating layout that permits windows to be moved and resized, represented by a fish-like ><>. Third party patches exist to add a golden section-based Fibonacci layout, horizontal and vertical row-based tiling, or a grid layout. The keyboard-driven menu utility "dmenu", developed for use with dwm, is used with other tiling WMs such as xmonad, and sometimes also with other "light-weight" software like Openbox and uzbl.
- EXWM — EXWM (Emacs X Window Manager) is a full-featured tiling X window manager for Emacs built on top of XELB. It features fully keyboard-driven operations, hybrid layout modes (tiling & stacking), dynamic workspace support, ICCCM/EWMH compliance, RandR (multi-monitor) support, and a built-in system tray.
- herbstluftwm – a manual tiling window manager (similar to i3 or Sway) that uses the concept of monitor independent tags as workspaces. Exactly one tag can be viewed on a monitor, with each tag containing its own layout. Like i3 and Sway, herbstluftwm is configured at runtime via IPC calls from herbstclient.
- fvwm
- musca – Dynamic window manager with influences from Ratpoison and DWM.
- i3 – a built-from-scratch window manager, based on wmii. It has vi-like keybindings, and treats extra monitors as extra workspaces, meaning that windows can be moved between monitors easily. Allows vertical and horizontal splits, tabbed and stacked layouts, and parent containers. It can be controlled entirely from the keyboard, but a mouse can also be used.
- Ion – combines tiling with a tabbing interface: the display is manually split in non-overlapping regions (frames). Each frame can contain one or more windows. Only one of these windows is visible and fills the entire frame.
- Larswm – implements a form of dynamic tiling: the display is vertically split in two regions (tracks). The left track is filled with a single window. The right track contains all other windows stacked on top of each other.
- LeftWM – a tiling window manager based on theming and supporting large monitors such as ultrawides.
- Notion - a tiling window manager (originally forked from Ion).
- Qtile – a tiling window manager written, configurable, and extensible in Python.
- Ratpoison — A keyboard-driven manually tiling window manager for X, inspired by GNU Screen.
- spectrwm — a dynamic tiling and reparenting window manager for X11. It tries to stay out of the way so that valuable screen real estate can be used for more important content. It strives to be small, compact, and fast. Formerly called "scrotwm" (a pun based on the word "scrotum").
- StumpWM – a keyboard driven offshoot of ratpoison supporting multiple displays (e.g. xrandr) that can be customized on the fly in Common Lisp. It uses Emacs-compatible keybindings by default.
- wmii (window manager improved 2) supports tiling and stacking window management with extended keyboard, mouse, and filesystem based remote control, replacing the workspace paradigm with a new tagging approach. The default configuration uses keystrokes derived from those of the vi text editor. The window manager offers extensive configuration through a virtual filesystem using the 9P filesystem protocol similar to that offered by Plan 9 from Bell Labs. Every window, tag, and column is represented in the virtual filesystem, and windows are controlled by manipulating their file objects (in fact, the configuration file is just a script interfacing the virtual files). This RPC system allows many different configuration styles, including those provided in the base distribution in plan9port and Bourne shell. The latest release 3.9 also includes configurations in Python and Ruby. The latest release supports Xinerama, shipping with its own keyboard-based menu program called wimenu, featuring history and programmable completion.
- xmonad – an extensible WM written in Haskell, which was both influenced by and has since influenced dwm.
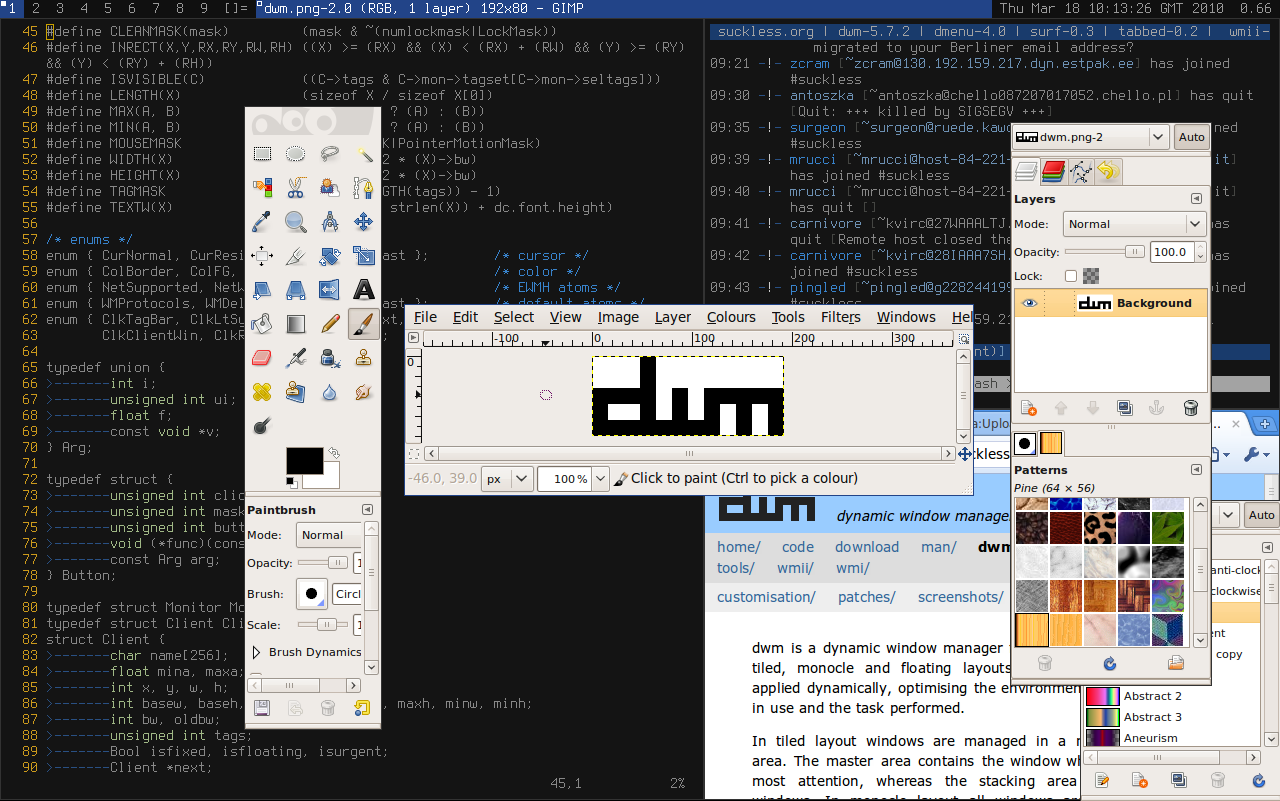
The dwm tiling window manager

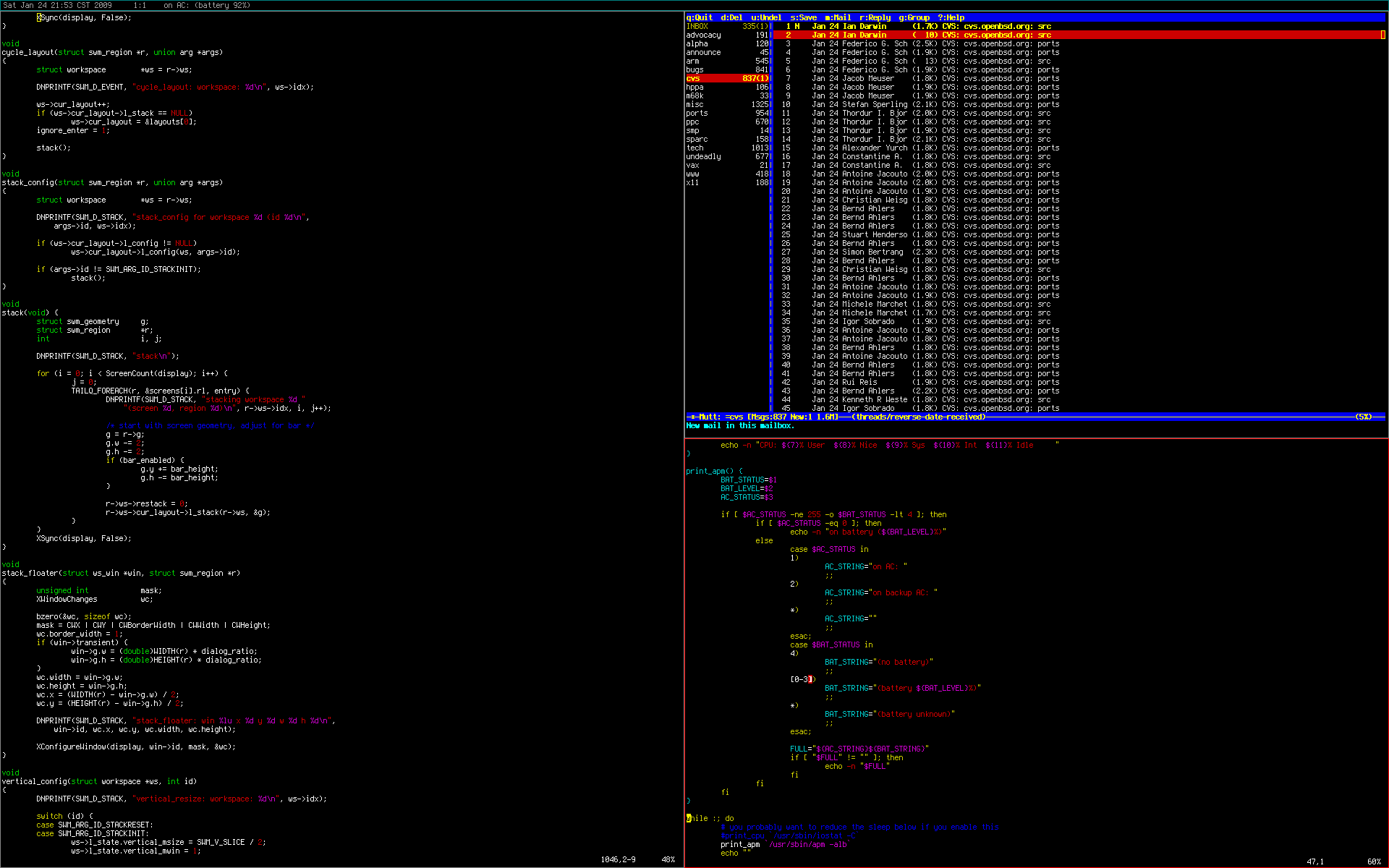
spectrwm with master area on the left

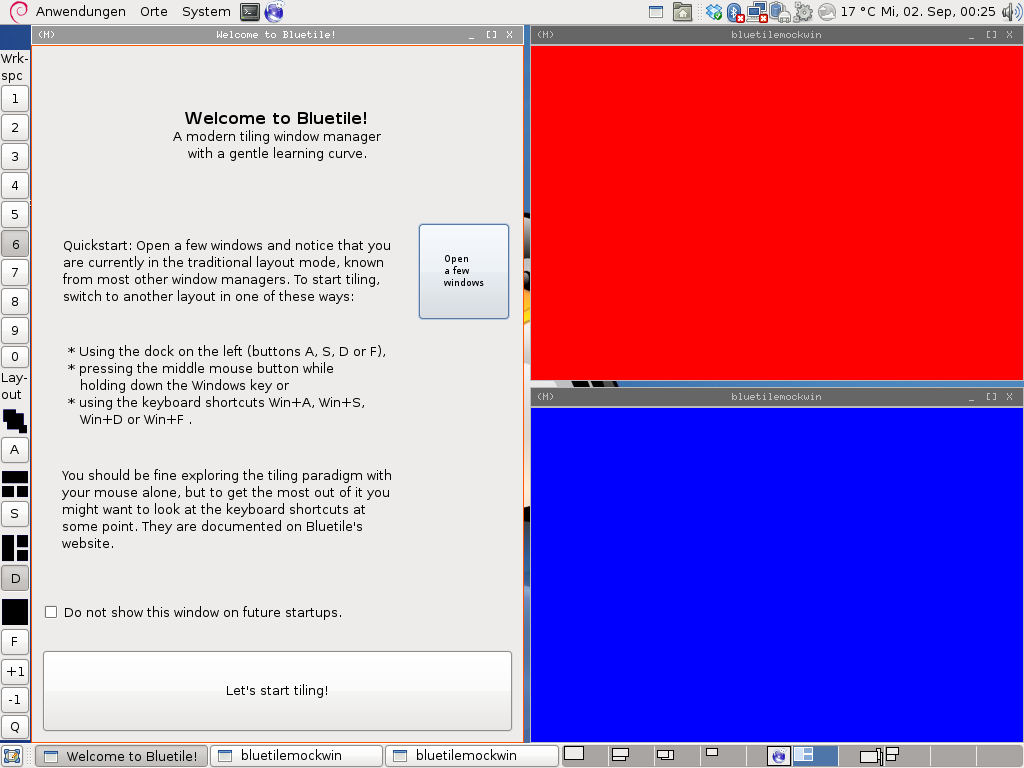
Bluetile is designed to integrate with the GNOME desktop

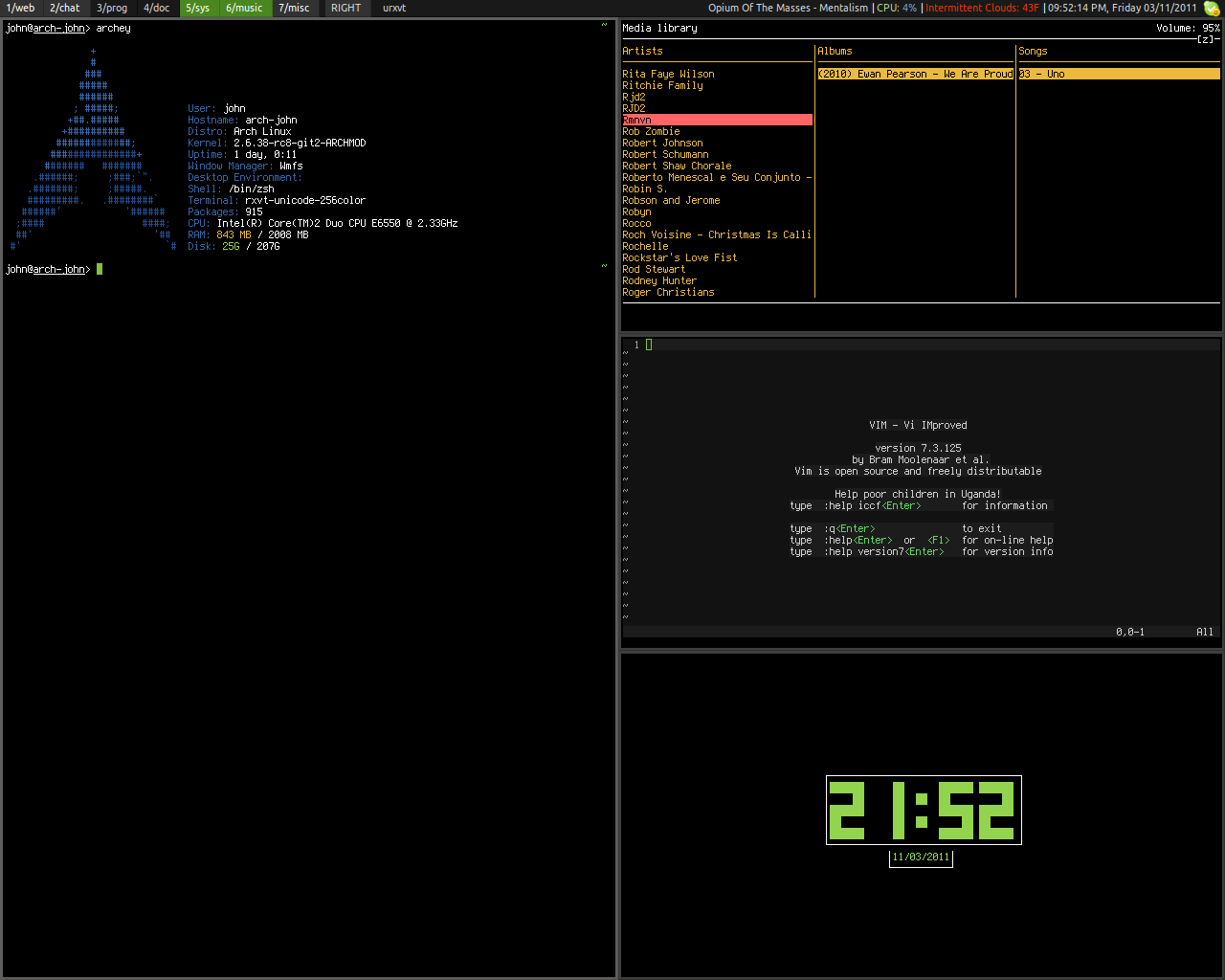
WMFS with urxvt, ncmpcpp, Vim, and tty-clock open

=== Wayland ===
Wayland is a newer windowing system that aims to replace the X Window System. Only a few tiling managers support Wayland natively.

==== List of tiling window managers for Wayland ====
- Hyprland — Hyprland is a dynamic tiling wayland compositor that offers unique features like smooth animations, dynamic tiling, and rounded corners.
- japokwm — Dynamic Wayland tiling compositor based around creating layouts, based on wlroots.
- newm — Wayland compositor written with laptops and touchpads in mind (currently unmaintained).
- niri — A scrollable-tiling Wayland compositor.
- Velox — Simple window manager based on swc, inspired by dwm and xmonad.
- Vivarium — A dynamic tiling Wayland compositor using wlroots, with desktop semantics inspired by xmonad.
- Sway — Sway is "a drop-in replacement for the i3 window manager, but for Wayland instead of X11. It works with your existing i3 configuration and supports most of i3's features, and a few extras".
- River - River is a dynamic tiling Wayland compositor with flexible runtime configuration, it is maintained and under regular updates.
- CageBreak is a tiling compositor for wayland, based on cage and inspired by Ratpoison, which is easily controlled through the keyboard and a unix domain socket.
- dwl - dwl is a wayland compositor, that was intended to fill the same space in the Wayland world that dwm does in X11. Like dwm, it is written in C, has a small codebase and lacks any configuration interface besides editing the source code.

=== Others ===
- The Oberon operating and programming system, from ETH Zurich includes a tiling window manager.
- The Acme programmer's editor / windowing system / shell program in Plan 9 is a tiling window manager.
- The Samsung Galaxy S3, S4, Note II, and Note 3 smartphones, running a custom variant of Android 4, have a multi-window feature that allows the user to tile two apps on the device's screen. This feature was integrated into stock Android as of version 7.0 "Nougat".
- The Pop Shell extension, from Pop! OS can add tiling windows manager functionalities to GNOME.
- The Amethyst window manager by ianyh, which provides window tiling for macOS and was inspired by xmonad.
- The yabai window manager that for macOS was inspired by bspwm.
- The MacTiler window manager to split screen on mac which was inspired by native split view.
- On macOS, Moom, from longstanding Mac developers Many Tricks, is an actively updated window tiling manager.
- KDE Plasma KWin includes a tiling editor since its version 5.27.

== Tiling applications ==
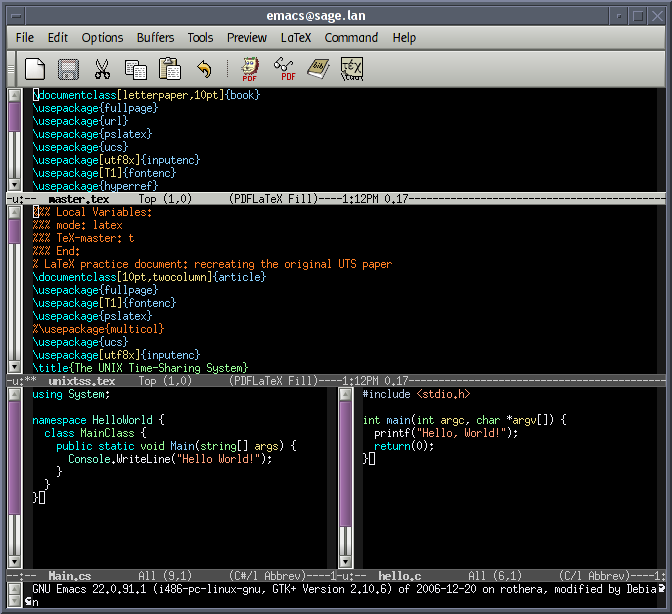
GNU Emacs showing an example of tiling within an application window

Although tiling is not the default mode of window managers on any widely used platform, most applications already display multiple functions internally in a similar manner. Examples include email clients, IDEs, web browsers, and contextual help in Microsoft Office. The main windows of these applications are divided into "panes" for the various displays. The panes are usually separated by a draggable divider to allow resizing. Paned windows are a common way to implement a master–detail interface.

Developed since the 1970s, the Emacs text editor contains one of the earliest implementations of tiling. In addition, HTML frames can be seen as a markup language-based implementation of tiling. The tiling window manager extends this usefulness beyond multiple functions within an application, to multiple applications within a desktop. The tabbed document interface can be a useful adjunct to tiling, as it avoids having multiple window tiles on screen for the same function.

== See also ==
- Integrated development environment style interface
- Split screen (computer graphics)
