= Larswm =

Tiling window manager software

larswm
- Developer: Lars Bernhardsson
- Stable release: 7.5.3 / July 15, 2004; 22 years ago
- Operating system: Unix-like
- Type: Window Manager
- Website: porneia.free.fr/larswm/larswm.html (mirror)

larswm is a window manager for the X window system that follows the tiling window manager paradigm. Using ideas from the older 9wm window manager, it features automatic tiling and virtual desktops. It also borrows other ideas, for example a limited form of plumbing, from the Acme development environment. Objects are tiled into non-overlapping areas, instead of using windows that can be stacked, as this approach can result in lower memory and CPU requirements.

== See also ==
- dwm
- wmii
- Ratpoison
- Desktop metaphor
