= KWin =

KDE window manager for Wayland and previously X11

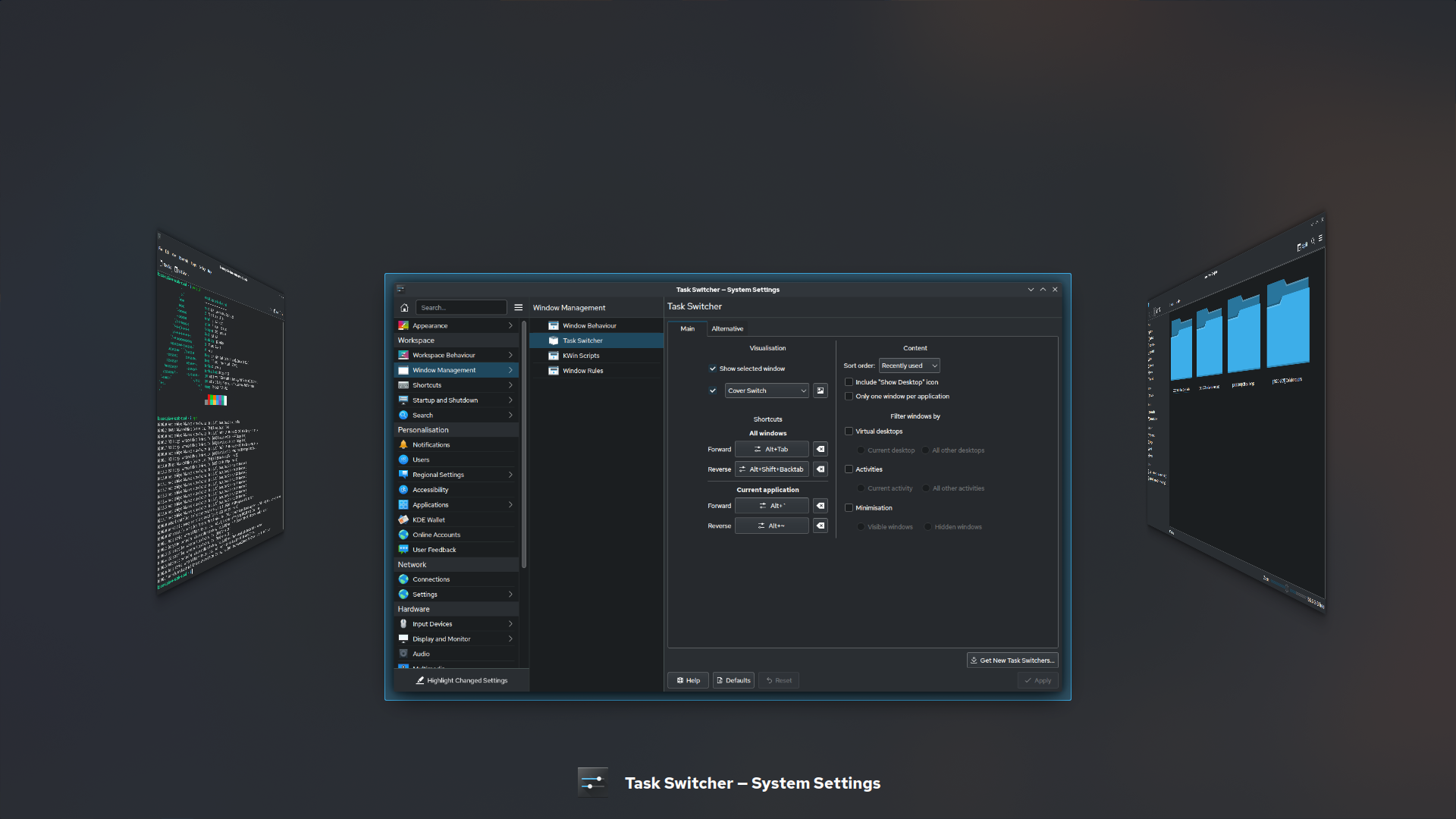
- KWin 5.24 with Cover Switch effect
- Developers: KDE (Martin Grässlin, et al.)
- Stable release: 6.7.90 / 10 September 2026; 2 months ago
- Written in: C++ (Qt)
- Operating system: Linux, BSD
- Type: Wayland compositor; X window manager
- License: GNU General Public License
- Website: invent.kde.org/plasma/kwin
- Repository: invent.kde.org/plasma/kwin

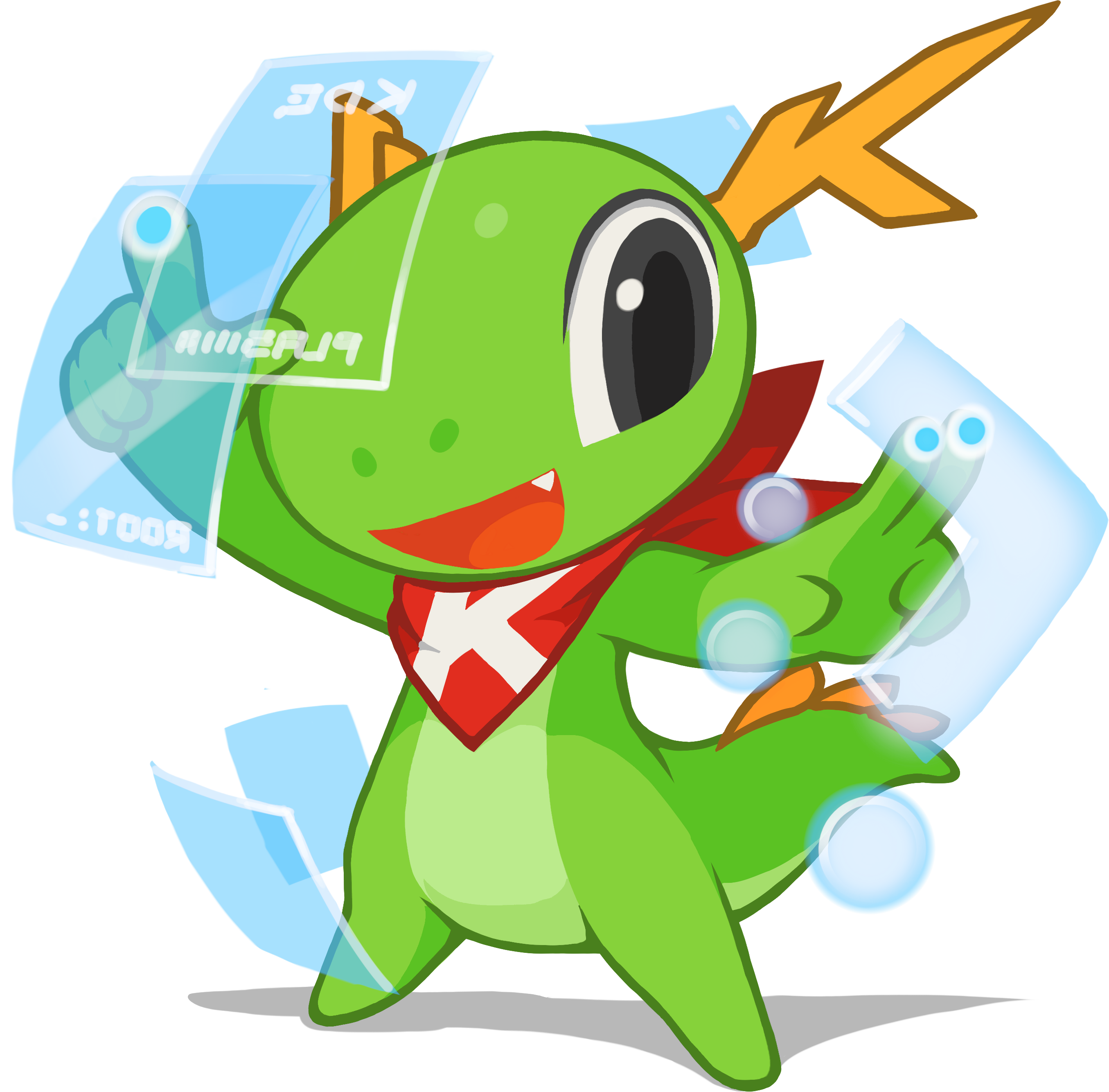
KDE mascot, Konqi, managing and moving windows

KWin is a Wayland compositor and was an X window manager. It is released as a part of KDE Plasma, for which it is the default window manager. KWin can also be used on its own or with other desktop environments.

KWin can be configured by scripting using QML or QtScript, both of which are based on ECMAScript.

== History ==
Name	Version	Details
KWM	1.0	
KWin	2.0	Extended support for themes and window effects.
KWin	3.0	Improved support for the extended ICCCM standards from freedesktop.org.
KWin	4.0	Compositing support and Compiz-like effects.
KWin	4.4	Released February 2010, maximizing and tiling by snapping to the screen-edges, grouping and tabbing.
KWin	4.5	Tiling. (removed in version 4.10, re-added with a tiling editor in 5.27)
KWin	4.9	Incompatible API change.
KWin	4.11	Last release based on KDE Platform 4, added experimental Wayland support.
KWin	5.0	Released July 2010 and first release based on KDE Frameworks 5 and Qt 5.
KWin	5.12	Released February 2018, KWin/X11 got feature frozen, meaning no new X11 specific features will be added. Martin Flöser stated that new features are easy and straight forward with the Wayland back-end, but require considerably more development to add the same feature to the X11 back-end.
KWin	6.0	Released February 2024.

== Look and feel ==
There are many window decorations for KWin, including the current default Breeze (shown below), the previous default Oxygen, Microsoft Windows-like Redmond, and Keramik.

KWin with the Breeze window decoration

== Compositing ==
Currently available compositing backends include OpenGL 1.2, OpenGL 2.0, OpenGL 3.1 and OpenGL ES 2.0.

=== Included effects ===
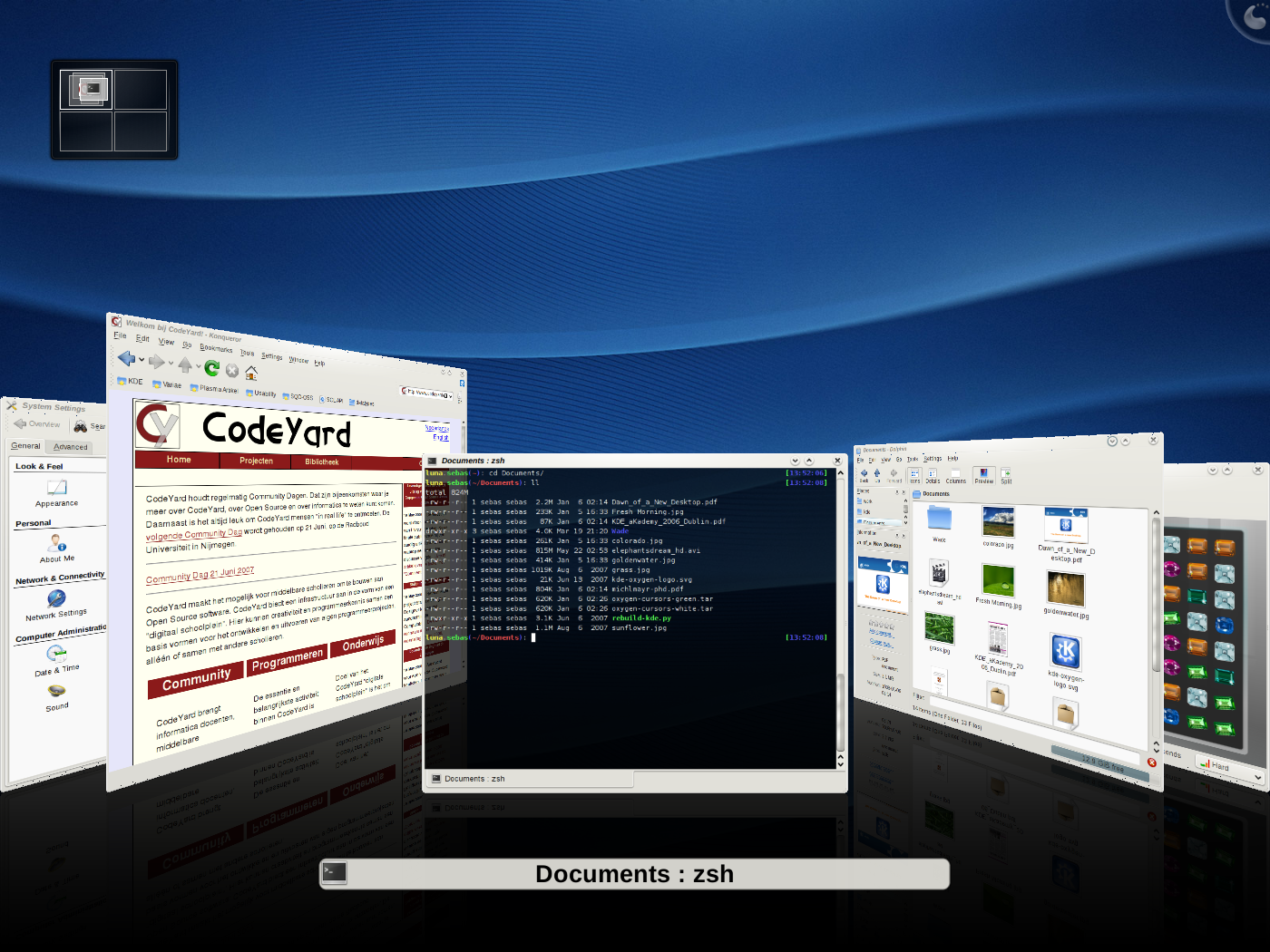
Screenshot showing the cover switch effect in KWin for KDE 4.1

As of KDE 4.3, the following effects are built-in:

==== Accessibility ====
Name	Description
Invert	Inverts the color of the desktop and windows
Looking glass	A screen magnifier that looks like a fish eye lens
Magnifier	Magnify the section of the screen that is near the mouse cursor
Sharpen	Makes the entire desktop look sharper
Snap Helper	Helps locate the centre of the screen when moving a window
Track mouse	Display a mouse cursor locating effect when activated
Zoom	Magnify the entire desktop

==== Appearance ====
Name	Description
Explosion	Make windows explode when they are closed
Fade	Make windows smoothly fade in and out when they are shown or hidden
Fade Desktop	Fade between virtual desktops when switching between them
Fall apart	Close windows fall into pieces
Highlight Windows	Highlight the appropriate window when hovering over taskbar entries
Login	Smoothly fade to the desktop when logging in
Logout	Desaturate the desktop when displaying the logout dialog
Magic Lamp	Simulate a magic lamp when minimizing windows
Minimize animation	Animate the minimizing of windows
Mouse mark	Allows you to draw lines over your desktop
Scale In	Animate the appearance of windows
Sheet	Make modal dialogues smoothly fly in and out when shown or hidden
Slide	Slide windows across the screen when switching virtual desktops
Sliding popups	Sliding animation for Plasma Popups
Taskbar Thumbnails	Display window thumbnails when hovering over taskbar entries
Thumbnail aside	Display window thumbnails on the edge of the screen
Translucency	Make windows translucent under different conditions
Wobbly windows	Deform windows while they are moving

==== Candy ====
Name	Description
Snow	Simulate snow falling on the desktop

==== Focus ====
Name	Description
Dialog parent	Darkens the parent windows of the currently active dialogue
Dim Inactive	Darken inactive windows
Dim screen for administrator mode	Darkens the entire screen when requesting root privileges
Slide Back	Slide back windows losing focus

==== Tools ====
Name	Description
Show FPS	Show kwins performance in the corner of the screen
Show Paint	Highlight areas of the desktop that have been recently updated

==== Window management ====
Name	Description
Box switch	Removed in latest versions, no longer available.
Cover switch	Removed in latest versions, no longer available.
Desktop grid	Zoom out so all desktops are displayed side-by-side in a grid
Flip switch	Removed in latest versions, no longer available.
Present windows	Zoom out until open windows can be displayed side by side
Resize Window	Effect to outline geometry while resizing a window

== See also ==
- Comparison of X window managers
- Compiz
- Mutter (software)
- Desktop Window Manager (Microsoft Windows)
- Quartz Compositor (macOS)
