= Paned window (computing) =

Computer user interface window that is divided into sections known as "panes"

A user interface window divided into three panes

A paned window is a window in a graphical user interface that has multiple parts, layers, or sections. Examples of this include a code browser in a typical integrated development environment; a file browser with multiple panels; a tiling window manager; or a web page that contains multiple frames. Simple console applications use an edit pane for accepting input and an output pane for displaying output.

The term task pane is used by Microsoft to identify any area cordoned off from the main screen area of an application and used for a specific function, such as changing the displayed font in a word processor.

== Three-pane interface ==
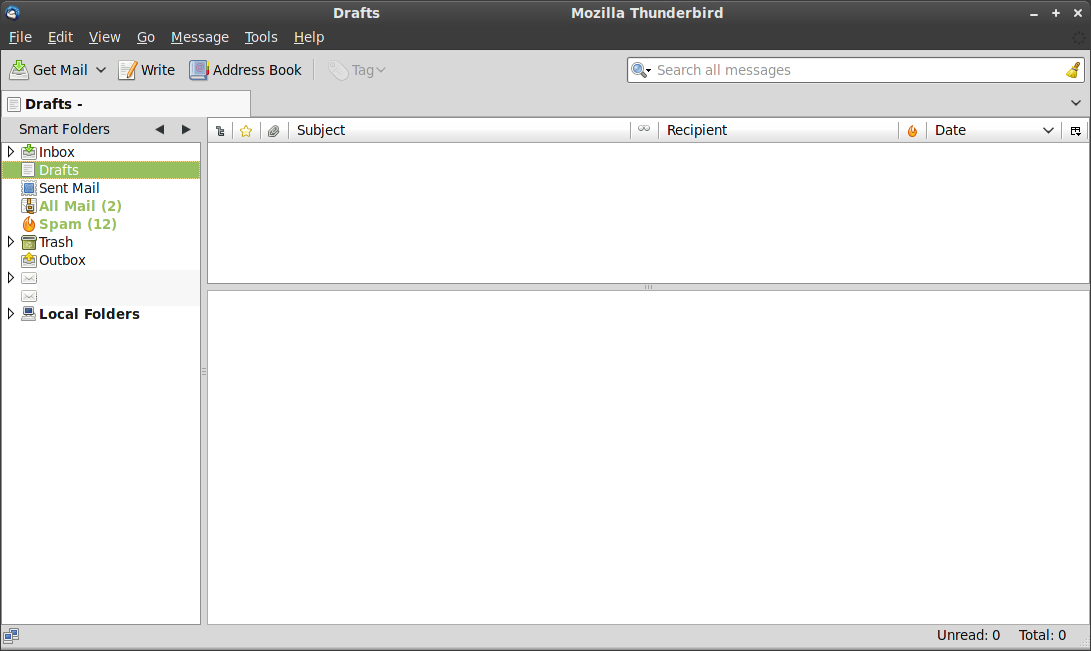
The three-paned main window of Mozilla Thunderbird.

A Three-pane interface is a category of graphical user interface in which the screen or window is divided into three panes displaying information. This information typically falls into a hierarchal relationship of master-detail with an embedded inspector window. Microsoft's Outlook Express email client popularized a mailboxes / mailbox contents / email text layout that became the norm until web-based user interfaces rose in popularity during the mid-2000s. Even today, many webmail scripts emulate this interface style.
