= FLWM =

X window manager

Fast Light Window Manager
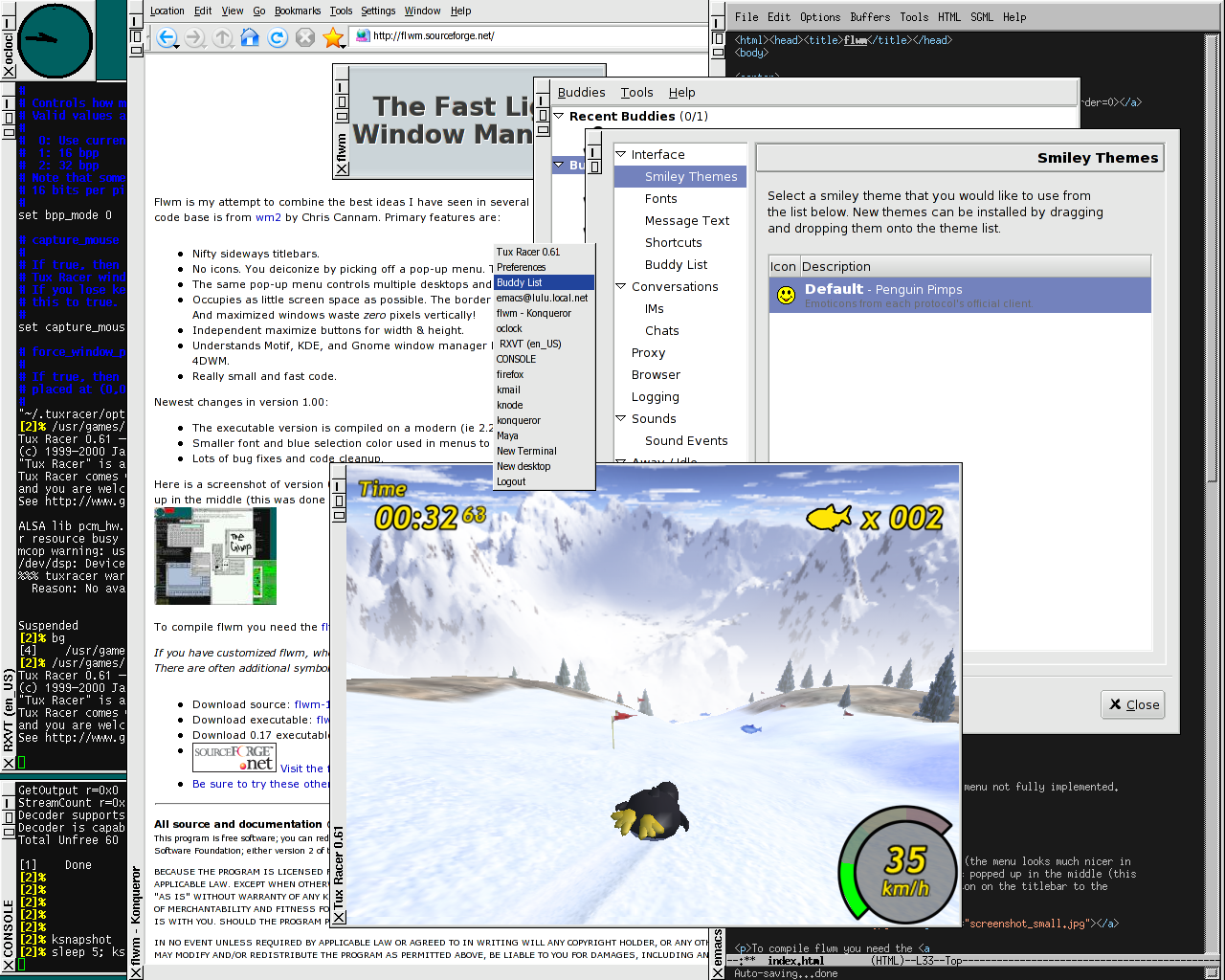
- Screenshot of Fast Light Window Manager
- Developer: Bill Spitzak
- Release: 1998; 28 years ago
- Stable release: 1.02 / 30 June 2006
- Written in: C++
- Operating system: Unix-like
- Platform: Linux
- Size: i386: 43.6 kB package, 156.0 kB installed, ia64: 58.1 kB package, 216.0 kB installed
- Type: Stacking window manager
- License: GPL-2.0-or-later
- Website: flwm.sourceforge.net

FLWM 1.02 Xsession running on Debian 7 Linux

The Fast Light Window Manager is an X window manager that is based on FLTK. FLWM is the default window manager for Tiny Core Linux. FLWM was influenced by WM2.

== Features ==
Features of the FLWM window manager include:

- Small (amd64: 43.8 kB Package Size, 118.0 kB Installed Size, i386: 45.3 kB Package Size, 121.0 kB Installed Size)
- Window decorations include borders and a vertical titlebar
- sloppy focus with click to focus (no autoraise)
- Multiple desktops
- Desktop switching via menu or by using the keyboard
- No support for themes. Colors are customizable via command line arguments.

== See also ==
- Comparison of X window managers
- Equinox Desktop Environment
