= Ratpoison =

Tiling window manager

ratpoison
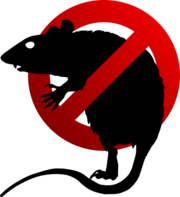

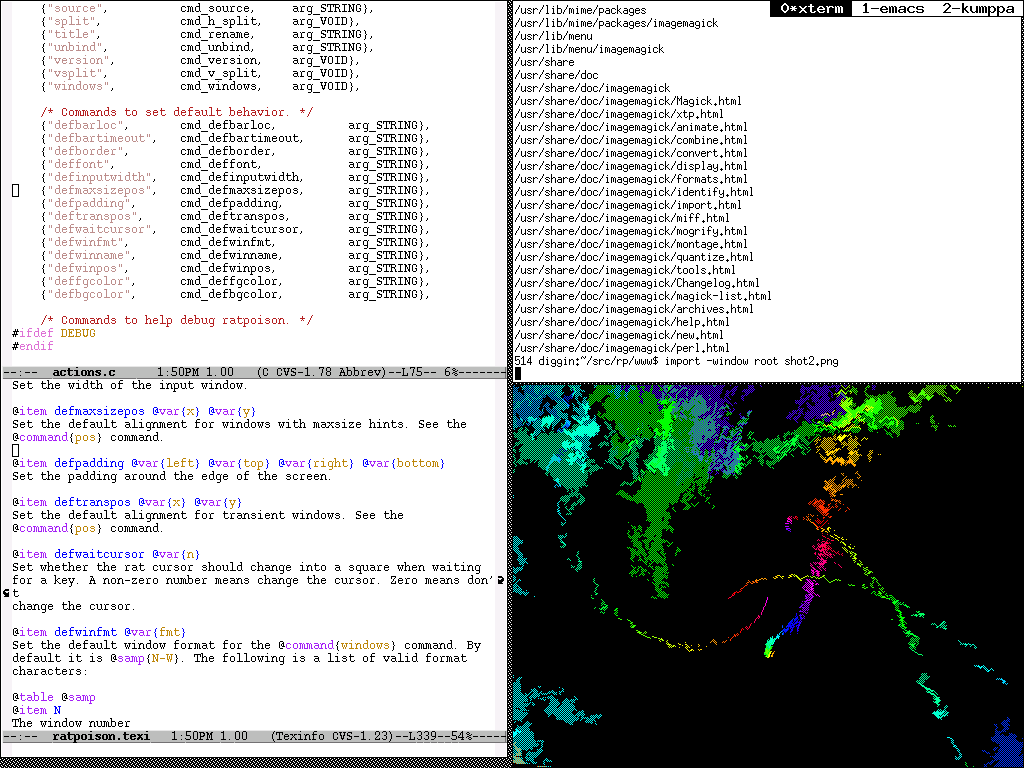
- ratpoison with a number of applications open
- Developer: Shawn Betts
- Initial release: December 4, 2000; 25 years ago
- Stable release: 1.4.9 / 4 April 2017
- Written in: C
- Type: Window manager
- License: GPL-2.0-or-later
- Website: www.nongnu.org/ratpoison/
- Repository: git.savannah.nongnu.org/cgit/ratpoison.git

ratpoison is a tiling window manager for the X Window System primarily developed by Shawn Betts. The user interface and much of their functionality are inspired by the GNU Screen terminal multiplexer. While ratpoison is written in C, Betts' StumpWM re-implements a similar window manager in Common Lisp.

== Overview ==
The name "ratpoison" reflects its major design goal: to let the user manage application windows without using a mouse. Unlike other tiling window managers like Ion, ratpoison completely ignores the mouse (or "rat"), and avoids window decorations as much as possible. The default keybindings are specifically designed to not conflict with Emacs.

== Usage ==
ratpoison relies on key chords similar to Emacs to control window management, with all window interactions being done through shortcuts. Each window occupies an entire frame and cannot overlap. Windows can be split either horizontally or vertically. Multiple workspaces and session management are supported. An application menu can be used for navigation to programs. Configuration is controlled via a config file.

== Reception ==
Mark Pilgrim praised it for being "minimalist" and "configurable." Jeff Covey, in 2002, found it was "lightning fast and perfectly stable." Peter Seebach remarked that "the convenience and performance are impressive; the learning curve, however, daunts many users." Similarly, Brian Proffitt observes that "the key commands are well explained in this window manager's man pages, and whatever you do, read these first. The keyboard commands do make sense after some use but initially the learning curve is pretty steep." In the same vein, Bruce Byfield found it (and stumpwm) "virtually unusable until you read the documentation." MakeTechEasier gave a positive review of ratpoison in 2013, although noting its steep learning curve. Bryan Lunduke of NetworkWorld gave a negative review, criticizing the key bindings and the difficulty of working with multi-window programs such as GIMP.

== See also ==
- dwm
- Ion
- Xmonad
- awesome
