= DeskSpace =

Virtual desktop management software

- A screenshot of DeskSpace in use showing three desktops in a cube formation.
- Original author: Christian Salmon
- Developer: Otaku Software Pty Ltd
- Stable release: 1.5.8.14 / 25 May 2012; 14 years ago
- Operating system: Microsoft Windows XP/Vista/7/8
- Available in: English, German, Spanish, French, Italian, Japanese
- Type: 3D Desktop Manager
- License: Shareware
- Website: www.otakusoftware.com/deskspace

DeskSpace, formerly known as Yod'm 3D (short for Yet anOther Desktop Manager 3D) is a virtual desktop manager available for Windows XP, Vista, 7 and 8.

== Features ==
DeskSpace maps six virtual desktops to a cube and allows the user to switch between them, similar to the cube plugin for the Compiz window manager for the X Window System in Linux. Deskspace is the first desktop manager to make the cube-style desktop feature available on Microsoft Windows. DeskSpace makes use of and requires DirectX 8.1 in contrast to most other virtual desktop managers that use OpenGL. It supports up to nine monitors. DeskSpace supports 64-bit applications, applications that require Administrator permissions to run, applications that implement User Interface Privilege Isolation, such as Internet Explorer 7 and Internet Explorer 8, and console windows.

DeskSpace costs US$24.95, and is available for a 14-day trial.

== History and development ==
Yod'm 3D was the first desktop manager to make the cube-style desktop feature available on Microsoft Windows. It was developed as freeware up to version 1.4 by Christian Salmon from Chris'n'Soft. It supported four virtual desktops on a single monitor. Yod'm 3D was acquired by Otaku Software Pty Ltd on July 9, 2007. Following the acquisition, it renamed to DeskSpace, and later versions would be trialware, not freeware. Yod'm 3D is still available to download from various sources.

Otaku Software held a beta test during August and September 2007, and the first release under the DeskSpace name, version 1.5.1, was released on 18 September 2007. DeskSpace 1.5.1 included a completely re-written graphics subsystem, based on the TopDesk graphics subsystem, that supported multiple monitors and 360 degree sky box backgrounds. Subsequent versions of DeskSpace has included re-written input, windowing, and virtual desktop subsystems. As of October 30, 2009 there were fewer than 500 lines of Yod'm source remaining in the DeskSpace code base.

On February 6, 2009, DeskSpace was reviewed on the BBC News 'Click' television segment.

== See also ==
- Compiz
- TopDesk
- Project Looking Glass
- VirtuaWin
