= RISC iX =

Discontinued Unix operating system

- RISC iX running on the Acorn A680
- Developer: Acorn Computers Ltd
- Written in: C, ARM assembly
- OS family: Unix-like
- Working state: Discontinued
- Initial release: 1988; 38 years ago
- Available in: English
- Supported platforms: Acorn Archimedes
- Default user interface: Graphical user interface

RISC iX is a discontinued Unix operating system designed to run on a series of workstations based on the Acorn Archimedes microcomputer. Heavily based on 4.3BSD, it was initially completed in 1988, a year after Arthur but before RISC OS. It was introduced in the ARM2-based R140 workstation in 1989, followed up by the ARM3-based R200-series workstations in 1990.

== Features ==
Acorn chose BSD 4.3 as the basis for RISC iX due to its academic origins, these being considered as making the software more appropriate for Acorn's principal target market of tertiary education. SunOS and NeXTSTEP systems were given as examples of other "modern high-performance workstations that use BSD". Other reasons for choosing BSD included better integration of networking and connectivity tools in comparison to System V.

- X11 (initially Release 2) with Ardent Window Manager, Tab Window Manager and Ultrix Window Manager available by default, plus X.desktop from IXI Limited
- System V virtual memory extensions, compatible with the "System V Interface Definition"
- C Compiler with ANSI C and Portable C Compiler (pcc) (Berkeley) compatibility
- Sun Microsystems Network File System version 3.2
- ARM assembly language

Although Acorn had licensed Sun Microsystems' NeWS in 1987, broad industry adoption of the X Window System, including Sun's belated endorsement, resulted in X11 technologies featuring in RISC iX. RISC iX 1.2 upgraded the X11 server to release 4, and was certified to conform to the X/Open Portability Guide 3 Base profile.

Peculiarly, the system console featured a two-cursor text copying mechanism inspired by Acorn's own earlier 8-bit range including the BBC Micro. One reason given for the inclusion of this feature was to be able to provide command line editing facilities for shells that did not offer it and to compensate for the exclusion of shells that did. A virtual terminal capability was also provided, allowing the user to switch between the system console, two other terminal sessions, and the X Window System session by pressing the BREAK key and choosing from the displayed devices.

The system implemented transparent demand paging of compressed executable programs, allowing the constituent pages of these compressed executables to be loaded into memory by the existing demand paging mechanism and then expanded in place for execution, taking advantage of the availability of sparse files (files with zero-padded regions) to reduce the disk space occupied by these pages. Shared library support, enabling processes to share library code, was also introduced to work around other "unpleasant" consequences of the hardware's 32 KB page size, one of these being the excess space occupied by processes residing in main memory, especially in situations where separate pages need to be allocated.

Despite these remedies, the workstations offering RISC iX were regarded as being hampered by the memory management unit (MMU) using 32 KB pages. The MEMC, providing the MMU capabilities in the system architecture, was designed to be simpler to implement than contemporary MMUs, providing a 128-entry lookup table that effectively partitioned physical RAM into 128 equally sized pages, with a 4 MB address space divided into 128 pages resulting in the 32 KB page size employed in these systems. A "logical" or virtual page could only be usefully mapped to a single physical page through this mapping. This approach coincidentally recreated that employed by the University of Manchester Atlas virtual memory architecture.

The hardware supporting RISC iX also did not have direct memory access capabilities for disk operations, meaning that the CPU would spend time servicing interrupts related to disk transfers resulting in "a definite reduction in, but not a complete loss of, available CPU power during disk transfers". However, by reducing the amount of data being fetched, the executable decompression technique did reduce CPU involvement in performing disk transfers, albeit at the expense of incurring CPU usage in the decompression of retrieved pages. Positive outcomes of the decompression scheme also included reduced loading on storage devices, of importance for networked storage, and generally improved disk transfer performance.

== Distribution ==
RISC iX was either supplied preinstalled on new computer hardware or was installed onsite from a portable tape drive by Granada Microcare, who would take the installation tape away with them. Upgrades to RISC iX 1.2 from earlier versions started at £349 for R140 machines, and new installations for A400-series machines started at £999. Installations required 100 MB of space on suitable hard drive or network storage, with hard drive and SCSI card bundles being offered from £1699 for R140 machines and from £2326 for A400-series machines.

Once installed a backup of the core operating system to three floppy disks was possible, allowing future reinstallation through the use of remote filesystems or backup media to transfer files to a machine.

== Hardware ==
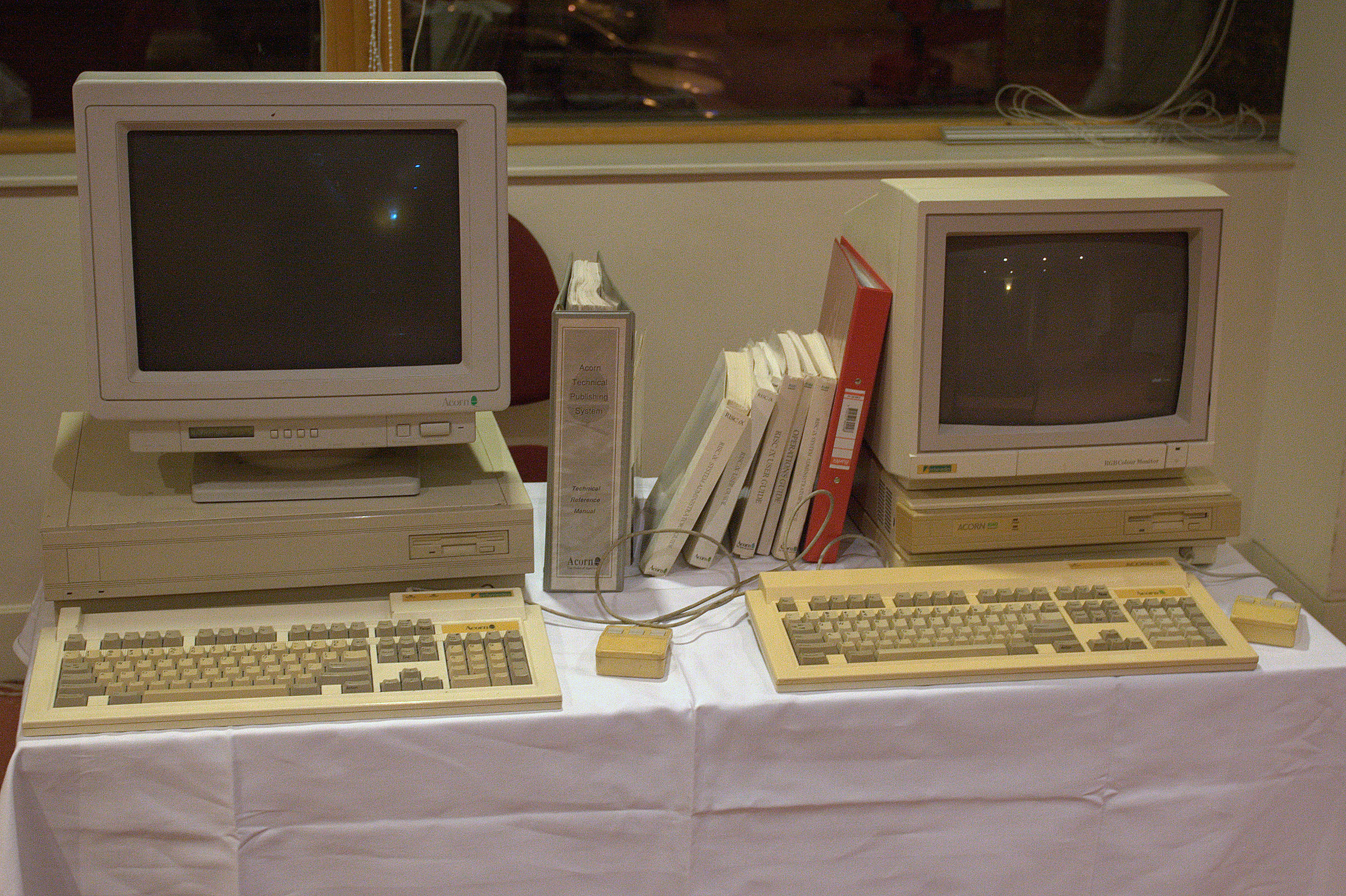
Acorn A680 and Acorn R140

According to documentation concerning RISC iX 1.2 availability, the operating system could be used on the R140, R225 and R260, being pre-installed on the R260, accessible via a fileserver (such as an R260) on the R225, and as an upgrade from RISC iX 1.15 or earlier on the R140. The A540, being practically identical to the R260, could support RISC iX as delivered, whereas A400-series machines required an Acorn SCSI card, with older A400-series machines also needing a memory controller upgrade and "all the appropriate field change orders" to have been performed. A300-series machines and the A3000 were not supported, largely due to potential compatibility issues with upgrades needed to bring these machines up to the required specification, in addition to operating temperature considerations with the A3000. Subsequent Archimedes machines, such as the A5000 and A30x0 models, were introduced without any prominent indication of RISC iX compatibility, although the A5000 expansion hardware was designed to support the same form of expansion card interrupt management as the A540, R-series and A400/1-series, specifically to be able to support RISC iX.

Several machines were designed specifically to run RISC iX.

=== M4 ===
An unreleased machine, built internally by Acorn for the development of RISC iX. Reputedly only two or three were built and one of them has subsequently been destroyed. All known examples are owned by The National Museum of Computing.

=== A680 Technical Publishing System ===
Prototyped for an Olivetti product but unreleased, the A680 contained an ARM2 processor, 8 MB RAM, a 70 MB hard drive running from an onboard SCSI controller, and either a 40 MB cartridge tape drive or a single 2 MB floppy drive. Up to four "podule" expansion cards could be fitted, although one slot was occupied by the laser beam printer (LBP) expansion card supporting a directly driven low-cost laser printer as an alternative to a PostScript printer connected via the serial port. The system was meant to run Frame Technology's FrameMaker under the "Acorn UNIX" operating system and NeWS graphical environment. To support 8 MB of RAM, dual memory controller (MEMC) units were employed.

The A680 was reportedly the first target for RISC iX and differed in certain ways from the Archimedes and R-series models. For instance, no other machine from Acorn Computers featured integrated SCSI. However, it is rumoured that overheating from the SCSI controller was one reason for the machine to never be released.

=== R140 ===
Based on the A440/1, the R140 uses the same 8 MHz ARM2 processor and 4 MB RAM, also providing a 60 MB ST506 hard drive, with the option of adding a second hard drive using the same internal controller. A SCSI adaptor was available (priced at £299 plus VAT) for other storage peripherals. Since the hardware is based on the Archimedes series, Acorn's podule expansions could be added, although appropriate drivers would have needed to be written.

At the time of initial release in 1989, the cost of the R140 was £3,500 for a standalone workstation without Ethernet connectivity. For the additional cost of the Ethernet expansion (£449 plus VAT), a network-capable workstation could be configured. A floating point expansion card based on the WE32206 could also be added (priced at £599 plus VAT). A discount introduced at the start of 1990 offered the R140 bundled with Ethernet expansion and either a 14-inch colour monitor with PC emulation software or a 19-inch monochrome monitor for £2999 plus VAT.

Supplied with RISC OS 2 in ROM, the machine would boot that OS then could either automatically boot RISC iX totally removing RISC OS from memory or continue running RISC OS – optionally being rebooted into RISC iX at any time.

An ordinary A440/1 with at least 4 MB RAM and a suitable hard drive could also run RISC iX.

=== R260 ===
Based on the A540, the R260 originally contained a 30 MHz ARM3 processor, 8 MB RAM (upgradable to 16 MB) SCSI adapter and a 100 MB or 120 MB SCSI hard drive (typically a Conner CP30100). It booted in the same style as the earlier R140, but was normally configured for customers to boot straight into RISC iX. The machine was supplied with an Ethernet adapter.

The system was released in 1990 priced at £3995 plus VAT, having been announced with a price of £5000 plus VAT. A floating point accelerator or "arithmetic co-processor", the FPA10, was made available in 1993 for the R260, as well as for the A540 and A5000 machines, priced at £99 plus VAT. These machines were designed to support the FPA device via a dedicated socket on the processor card (or, in the case of the A5000, on the motherboard), and offered a peak throughput of 5 MFLOPS at 26 MHz.

A similarly configured A540 could run RISC iX. Production of the A540 and R260 was discontinued in mid-1993.

=== R225 ===
The R225 was a diskless version of the R260. It required a network file server or an R260 to boot. The system was released alongside the R260 priced at £1995 plus VAT, having been announced with a price of £3000 plus VAT.

== Peripherals ==
As well as industry-standard Ethernet, Acorn's own Econet was supported, facilitating connectivity between Econet and IP-based Ethernet networks. Moreover, the Econet interface on a RISC iX workstation could be treated as a "Unix networking" interface, permitting TCP/IP requests to be sent over Econet to hosts capable of handling them. In 1991, with Ethernet becoming more widespread on campus networks, Acorn offered a Network Gateway Starter Pack featuring the R140 equipped with Econet and Ethernet adapters at a price of £2499, with a licence for the TCP/IP Protocol Suite included to allow Archimedes computers to be able to communicate with such Ethernet-based networks via the gateway.

Similar Econet gateway capabilities were eventually extended to computers running RISC OS with Acorn's TCP/IP Protocol Suite product and with the broader Acorn Universal Networking (AUN) suite of technologies, and a device driver update eventually provided a similar means of routing TCP/IP communications over Econet networks for RISC OS machines.

== Application software ==
In 1989, Acorn announced support for the R140 from a number of application software vendors, including Informix, along with applications such as Uniplex, Q-Office (from Quadratron), Tetraplan, Sculptor (from MPD), Sea Change (from Thomson), Recital ("a dBase compatible relational database") and Q-Calc ("a Lotus, key-compatible spreadsheet"). Applications for school administration and financial management - SIMS and SCRIPT (a COBOL-based school administration system) - were also offered in a bundle with the R140 workstation. The database application development tool DataFlex was announced for the R140 in mid-1990.

== Legacy ==
Despite Acorn stating an intention to offer a Unix system from as early as 1982, with the National Semiconductor 32016 platform being the proposed vehicle for such a product, technical difficulties with the 32016's chipset led to the Acorn Cambridge Workstation - the surviving product from the Acorn Business Computer range - shipping with a proprietary Acorn operating system instead of the planned Xenix-based Unix offering.

With the development of the ARM chipset, however, Acorn was finally in a position to deliver its own system capable of running Unix, announcing work as early as the autumn of 1987 on an "upmarket ARM-based workstation to run the Unix operating system" for release in mid-1988 to compete with Sun and Apollo models in the higher education market, featuring a built-in WE32206 "arithmetic co-processor". Reports had emerged of Acorn commissioning a small Unix porting house, XI Software, to deliver a version of System V Release 2 for its ARM-based systems, this presumably referenced as "Acorn UNIX" in literature for its unreleased Technical Publishing System, otherwise known as "Acorn RISC Unix" in certain catalogues of Unix history.

The company eventually brought the R140 to market running the BSD-derived RISC iX in early 1989, alongside the second iteration of ARM2-based Archimedes 400-series models, following up in 1990 with the R225 and R260 alongside the high-end, ARM3-based Archimedes 540, thereby delivering on their earlier ambitions within the space of a couple of years. The introduction of the R225 and R260 renewed the enthusiasm of some commentators who conceded that the earlier ARM2-based R140, alongside competition based on the 80386, 68020 and 68030 processors, were underpowered to run "wedding-cake configurations" of the X Window System, Motif, X.desktop and other software, but considered Acorn's ARM3 products, alongside competition based on the 80486, SPARC and 88000 processors, to be more capable of such tasks.

Nevertheless, Acorn discontinued R260 production in 1993, shortly after announcing the floating point accelerator unit, which had been promised for 1991 and repeatedly delayed, and subsequently offered no new RISC iX system products. Although there were expectations that Acorn's corporate parent, Olivetti, might have provided opportunities for ARM-based Unix workstation products, leveraging its relationship with AT&T as the proprietor of Unix, it became apparent that AT&T's own interests lay with products based on the SPARC architecture, with AT&T also having an ownership stake in Sun. Olivetti's own workstation strategy was incoherent at the turn of the 1990s, with the company announcing products based on MIPS and Alpha architectures before settling on Intel's architecture once again.

Performance of the Acorn R-series and various competitors in approximate chronological order of introduction

Olivetti itself had previously made a workstation, the CP486, based on the Intel 80486 running SCO Unix or Xenix and offering support for the Weitek 4167 floating point unit and Intel i860 "application accelerator". This machine was available in 1989 and described as the basis of a "high-cost authoring workstation" in a European initiative, but was rather more expensive than Acorn's RISC iX workstations, costing $16,250 for a configuration with 4 MB of RAM and 150 MB hard disk. Crude hardware performance comparisons based on Dhrystone benchmarking under like-for-like environments - taking results from CP486 benchmarks run under DOS and from Archimedes benchmarks run under RISC OS - indicate that the CP486 was around four times faster than the R140 and was still faster than the R260. Floating-point arithmetic performance of the CP486 was approximately double that of the R260 with FPA fitted. Of more relevance to RISC iX itself, in the context of the workstations developed for European initiatives, the Chorus system was to be used as the basis of the Unix operating system provided, both on the 486-based authoring workstation and the ARM3-based "low cost delivery workstation", with Chorus having been ported to the ARM3 processor.

In computational performance terms, Acorn's R140 compared unfavourably with other 1989 models such as the Sun SPARCstation 1 and Digital DECstation 3100, particularly with regard to floating-point performance, although such disadvantages could perhaps have been somewhat overlooked in an entry-level workstation costing around £4,000 or approximately $6,545, compared to $12,620 for the DECstation 3100, or $7,995 for the entry-level DECstation 2100. The R260 compared more favourably in terms of integer performance with its contemporaries employing processors such as the Intel 486 and Motorola 68030, but comparing less favourably with 68040-based models and newer models from traditional RISC workstation vendors. In terms of pricing, although the R260 maintained a similar price point to the R140, increasing pricing competition between Digital and Sun brought models like the DECstation 2100 down to $5,950 even before the R260's introduction at an already reduced price of £3,995, equivalent to $7,094. At the point of the introduction of floating-point hardware for the R260 in 1993, the performance of the R260 was decidedly uncompetitive with the final MIPS-based DECstation models and contemporary SPARCstation models.

In 1994, the Risc PC launched with an improved chipset that was amenable to running Unix, and amidst a certain level of interest in the "large potential" of Unix running on the new machine, the independent RiscBSD initiative was announced in August 1994 to bring "a base of BSD4.4 - probably the NetBSD flavour" to this hardware platform. A "very, very alpha kernel" was demonstrated after six weeks of initial effort by the RiscBSD developers at the Acorn World show in late 1994. Meanwhile, another initiative, ArcBSD, sought to port FreeBSD to "all 32-bit Acorn machines with sufficient RAM and hard disk space".

Although not developed with any significant Acorn involvement, RiscBSD eventually became NetBSD/arm32 (being imported in NetBSD 1.2) and was used in a Risc PC-based product sold by Acorn's education joint venture, Xemplar, called NCServer. Support for this product continued after the Apple takeover of Xemplar in 1999 through a company, Precedence Technologies, founded to continue development having acquired the remaining network computer inventory. The product evolved to employ server hardware based on the Simtec CATS board, providing access to files and applications stored on the server via an HTML-based interface, with RISC OS-based network computers being able to run the NCWorks suite of applications customised from various familiar RISC OS applications such as Draw, Paint, EasiWriter, DataPower and Schema. NetBSD support for Acorn machines was eventually provided by the acorn32 port for Risc PC and A7000 family models, along with the acorn26 port for Archimedes, A-series and R-series models, thus bringing a more modern Unix variant to Acorn's original Unix workstations.
