= Focus (computing) =

Active GUI component receiving input

In a computing graphical user interface (GUI), a component has focus when it is selected to receive input from the user by an event such as a mouse button click or keypress. Moving the focus away from a specific user interface element is known as a blur event in relation to this element. Typically, the focus is withdrawn from an element by giving another element the focus. This means that focus and blur events are virtually simultaneous in relation to different user interface elements, one that becomes focused and one that is "blurred" (in the computing, not visual, sense).

The concept is similar to a cursor in a text-based environment. However, when considering a graphical interface, there is also a mouse pointer involved. Moving the mouse will typically move the mouse pointer without changing the focus. The focus can usually be changed by clicking on a component that can receive focus with the mouse. Many desktops also allow the focus to be changed with the keyboard. By convention, the Tab ↹ key is used to move the focus to the next focusable component and ⇧ Shift+Tab ↹ to the previous one. When graphical interfaces were first introduced, many computers did not have mice, so this alternative was necessary. This feature makes it easier for people unable to use a mouse to use the user interface. In certain circumstances the arrow keys can be used to change focus.

== Window focus ==
The behaviour of focus on one's desktop can be governed by policies in window management. Ostensibly prior to the widespread adoption of the term "focus", in the Sapphire window manager for the PERQ workstation's Accent-based operating system, the window retaining the focus was known as the "listener".

=== Click to focus ===
On most mainstream user-interfaces, such as ones made by Microsoft and Apple, it is common to find a "focus follows click" policy (or "click to focus"), where one must click the mouse inside of the window for that window to gain focus. This also typically results in the window being raised above all other windows on screen. If a clickfocus model such as this is being used, the current application window continues to retain focus and collect input, even if the mouse pointer is over another application window.

=== Focus follows pointer ===
Another common policy on Unix systems using X Window System (X11) is the "focus follows mouse" policy (or FFM), where the focus automatically follows the current placement of the pointer. The focused window is not necessarily raised; parts of it may remain below other windows. Window managers with this policy usually offer "autoraise," which raises the window when it is focused, typically after a configurable short delay. A possible consequence of a followfocus policy is that no window has focus when the pointer is moved over the background with no window underneath; otherwise the focus simply remains in the last window.

=== Sloppy focus ===
The sloppy focus model is a variant of the followfocus model. It allows input to continue to be collected by the last focused window when the mouse pointer is moved away from any window, such as over a menubar or desktop area.

== Focus models used by X11 window managers ==
	Clickfocus	Followfocus	Sloppyfocus
aewm	No	Yes	No
aewm++	Yes	No	No
AHWM	Yes	No	Yes
awesome	Yes	Yes	Yes
CTWM	Yes	Yes	Yes
dwm	Yes	Yes	No
E16	Yes	Yes	Yes (default)
evilwm	No	Yes	No
FLWM	No	No	Yes
Fluxbox	Yes	Yes	Yes
FVWM^{[α]}	Yes	Yes (default)	Yes
IceWM	Yes	Yes	Yes
Karmen	Yes	No	No
lwm	Yes	No	Yes
TinyWM	No	No	Yes
Whim	Yes	No	Yes
WindowLab	Yes (with no autoraise)	No	No
Xfwm	Yes	Yes	Yes
Mutter	Yes	Yes	Yes
JWM	Yes	No	Yes
MWM	Yes	No	No

== Intra-window component focus ==
Individual components of a window may also have a focal position. For instance in a text editing package, the text editing window must have the Focus so that text can be entered. When text is entered into the component, it will appear at the position of the text-cursor, which will also normally be movable using the mouse pointer.

Which component should have the default focus, and how focus should move between components, are difficult but important problems in user interface design. Giving the wrong thing focus means that the user has to waste time moving the focus. Conversely, giving the right thing focus can significantly enhance the user experience.

== See also ==
- Tab order
- Focus stealing
- Selection (user interface)

== Notes ==
^{α} Per window or window class, with additional support for "never focus" — windows that should never receive focus.
