= SWM =

SWM may refer to:

- swm or Selbourne Window Manager, a free X Window manager
- SWM (motorcycles) or Speedy Working Motors, a manufacturer of off-road motorcycles in the 1970s and 1980s
- SWM (automobiles) Speedy Working Motors automotive brand established in 2016
- Stanford Watershed Model, a hydrology transport model
- South Wales Metro, a proposed train network across South Wales
- Stadtwerke München (SWM), German communal company, owned by the city of Munich
- Swanscombe railway station, Kent, England (National Rail station code)
