= UWM =

UWM may refer to:

- Universities:
  - University of Wisconsin–Milwaukee
    - WUWM, its public radio station licensed to Milwaukee
  - University of Warmia and Mazury in Olsztyn, Poland
- In computing:
  - Ultrix Window Manager
- Others
  - Ticker symbol for ProShares Ultra Russell2000 at NYSE Arca
  - United Wholesale Mortgage
