= Patrick Chan (disambiguation) =

Patrick Chan may refer to:

- Patrick Chan (born 1990), Canadian figure skater
- Patrick Chan (judge) (born 1948), Hong Kong judge
- Patrick Peter Chan, Canadian computer scientist

== See also ==
- Patrick Chung (born 1987), American football player
