= Twm =

Window manager for the X Window System

twm
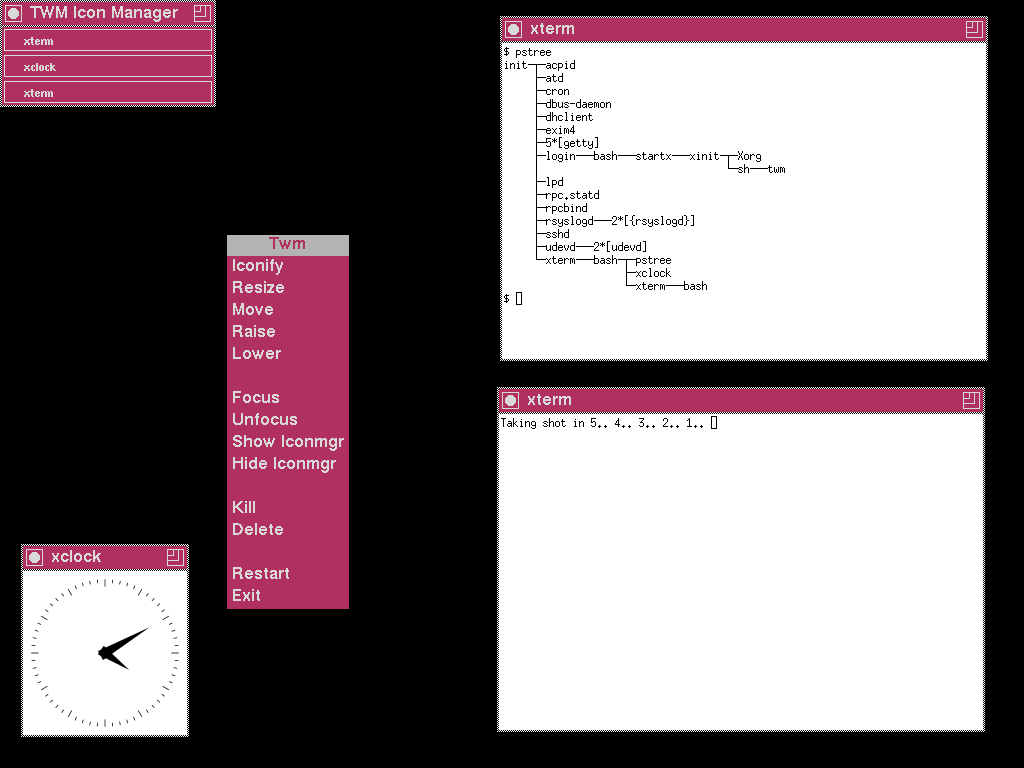
- TWM with a classic maroon color scheme, running in Debian
- Original author: Tom LaStrange
- Initial release: 1987
- Stable release: 1.0.13.1 / 6 May 2025
- Written in: C
- Type: Window manager
- License: MIT-open-group; MIT-CMU; XFree86-1.0
- Repository: gitlab.freedesktop.org/xorg/app/twm

twm is a window manager for the X Window System. Started in 1987 by Tom LaStrange, it has been the standard window manager for the X Window System since version X11R4. The name originally stood for Tom's Window Manager, but the software was renamed Tab Window Manager by the X Consortium when they adopted it in 1989. twm is a stacking window manager that provides title bars, shaped windows, and icon management. It is highly configurable and extensible.

twm was a breakthrough achievement in the early years, but has been superseded by other window managers which, unlike twm, use a widget toolkit rather than a combination of the X Toolkit Intrinsics and XRandR.

Various other window managers, such as vtwm, tvtwm, CTWM, and FVWM, were derived from twm's source code.

twm is still standard with X.Org Server, and is available as part of many X Window System implementations.

== Usage ==
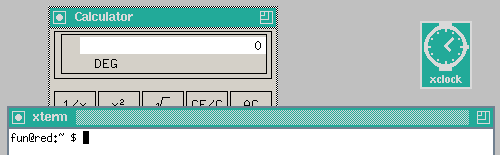
twm with xcalc and xterm, the xterm window being in focus. xclock is iconified.

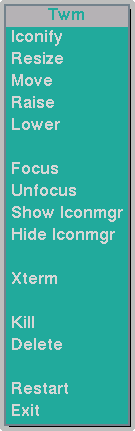
twm menu

Twm Xsession running on Debian 7 Linux

twm's interface differs from modern common X window managers and desktop environments, many of which tend to work similarly to the Apple Macintosh or Microsoft Windows user interfaces. New users often find twm difficult without reading the manual page.

In the default configuration of twm, the title bar has two buttons:

- Resize button (nested squares): the user clicks here, drags the mouse pointer to the edge to be moved, then releases when the window is the desired size.
- Iconify button (circle): reduces the window to an icon.

There is no title bar button to close a window. A left click on the desktop brings up a menu that includes an option to delete (close) a window. Window close functionality for the titlebar can be configured in the .twmrc file:

See Closing program windows in twm at Wikibooks.

A left click on the title bar brings the window to the top of the window stack; a middle click moves the window; a right click sends the window to the bottom of the window stack.

Window focus follows the mouse pointer (point-to-focus), rather than being on whichever window was clicked last (click-to-focus).

When a new window is created, a 3×3 grid is displayed following the mouse pointer, waiting for the user to click where the window should appear — left-click to appear in that position with that size, middle-click to resize the window before its creation, right-click to appear at that position but long enough vertically to reach the bottom of the screen.

Note that any of the above may be modified by updating the configuration file. (The system file is typically /etc/X11/twm/system.twmrc and the user file is typically ~/.twmrc .)

== History ==
twm was written as a replacement for the uwm window manager by Tom LaStrange while he was working at Evans & Sutherland, which was part of the X Consortium: "I sat down at my monochrome Sun 3/50 and typed vi twm.c and then opened the X11 documentation. twm was my first X program. About six months later, I convinced my manager to let me send a copy to the comp.windows.x newsgroup for testing." A version for X11R1 was published on the Usenet newsgroup comp.unix.sources on June 13, 1988.

Months later, Jim Fulton of the X Consortium (which was at the time part of MIT) approached Evans and Sutherland and asked them to turn over the code maintenance to the X Consortium. Fulton then made it compliant with the nascent Inter-Client Communication Conventions Manual. Subsequently, twm was released as the standard sample window manager for X11R4, replacing uwm.

According to Fulton, the word "tab" was chosen because it conveniently started with 'T' and put the emphasis on the squeezing feature window title bars, which made them look like folders with tabs.

== Authors ==
twm was originally written by Tom LaStrange. Later contributors include Jim Fulton, Keith Packard, and Dave Sternlicht, all of whom were employees of the X Consortium.
