= Motif Window Manager =

Software for managing computer windows

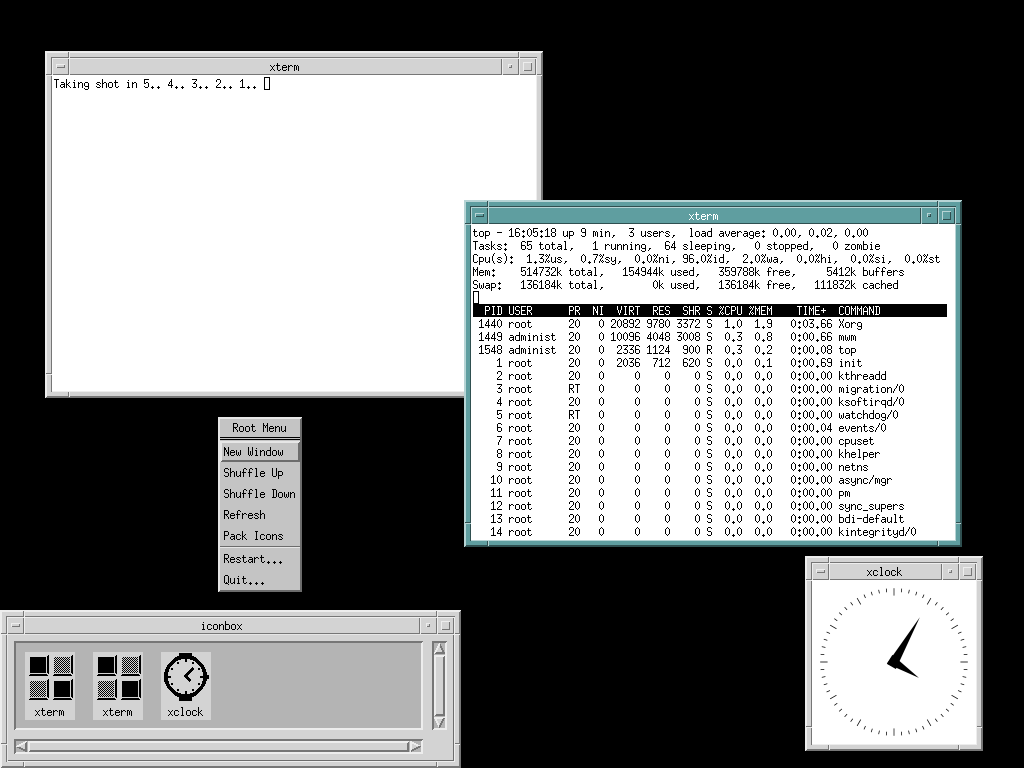
- MWM running on Debian Linux
- Developers: Open Software Foundation, The Open Group
- Stable release: 2.3.8 / 5 December 2017
- Operating system: Unix-like, OpenVMS
- Type: Window manager
- License: 2012: LGPL-2.1-or-later (Note: LGPL-2.1-or-later since 2012-10-23, version 2.3.4.); 1990s: Proprietary
- Website: motif.ics.com

The Motif Window Manager (MWM) is an X window manager based on the Motif toolkit.

== Overview ==
MWM is a lightweight window manager, having robust compliance and configuration of the features it has. MWM first appeared in the early 1990s, along with the Motif toolkit. MWM supports: Common User Interface (i.e., Alt-Tab is switch windows, a standard), some International support, Common Desktop Environment, X Resource Database (/home/app-defaults/ and runtime), X Session Manager protocol, X Edited Resource Protocol (edit widget data), desktop icons, optional use of images to decorate, and had supported Virtual desktop (removed since 2.1) but now supports non-virtual desktop panning. MWM is a window manager, not a full desktop environment, so it only manages windows; it is expected that configuration, programs, sound, are provided by other programs. A plain text file is parsed to customize menus, user input mappings, management features, and user made functions of the same.

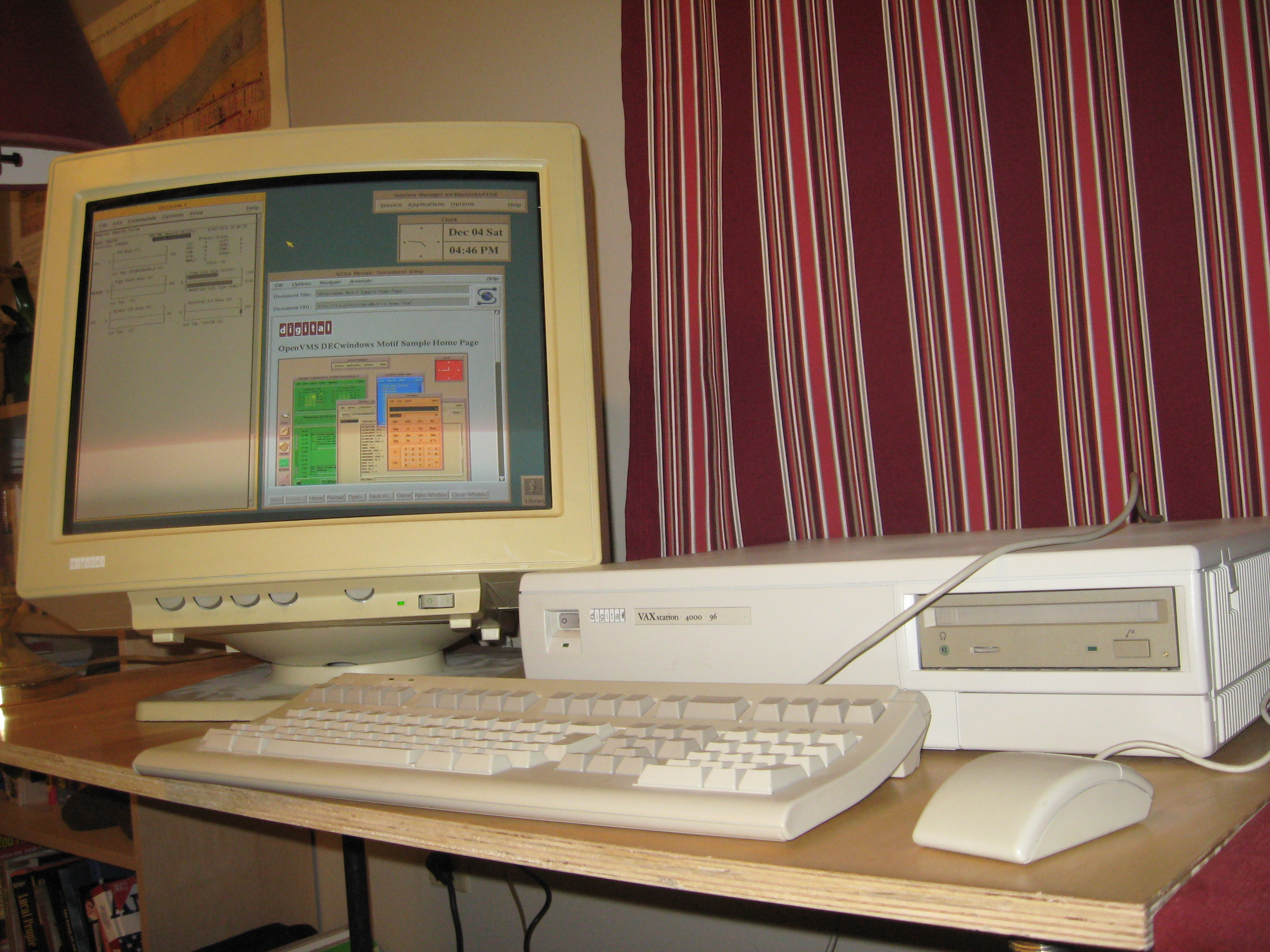
VAXstation 4000 model 96 running OpenVMS 6.1 and the mwm-based DECwindows Motif environment

== Licensing ==
Originally, MWM and Motif could only be purchased. The same software was also available as OpenMotif, though not on properly open-source or free software terms. In late 2012, Motif and MWM were released under the LGPL-2.1-or-later license as free software.

== See also ==
- FVWM
- Visual User Environment
