= CTWM =

Unix window manager

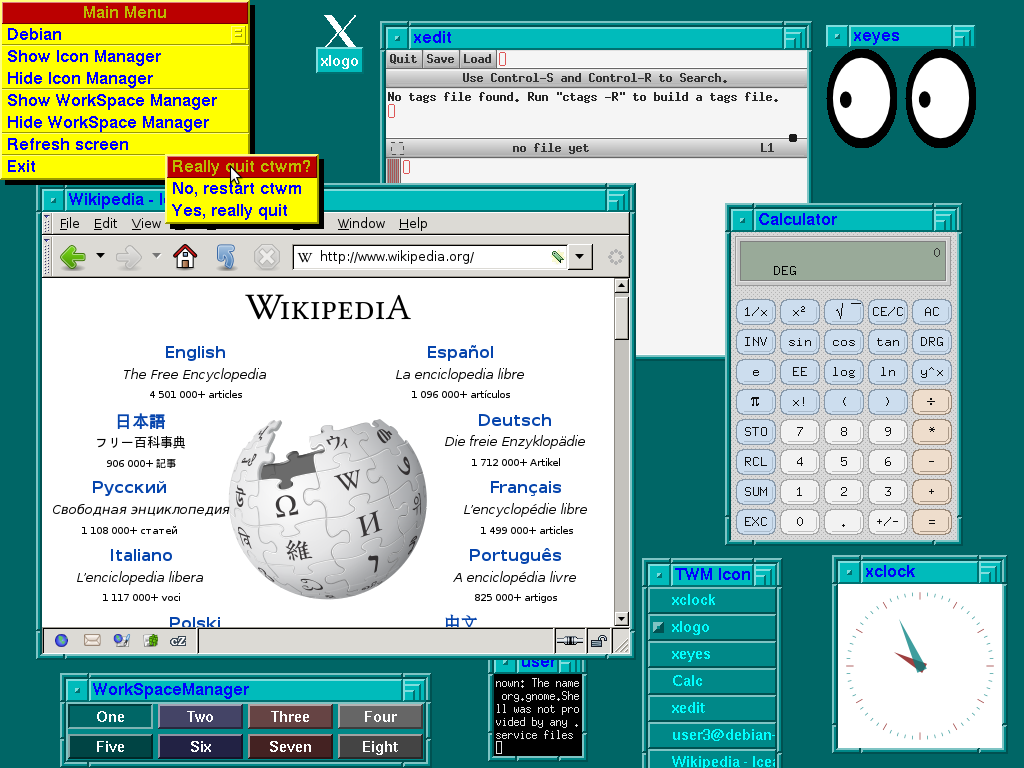
- CTWM 3.7 screenshot captured on Debian 7 Linux
- Release: May 1992; 34 years ago
- Stable release: 4.1.0 / 26 March 2023
- Written in: C
- Type: Window manager
- License: X11-X11R5; MIT-CMU
- Website: www.ctwm.org
- Repository: github.com/ctwm-wm/ctwm

In Unix computing, CTWM (Claude's Tab Window Manager) is a stacking window manager for the X Window System in the twm family of window managers. CTWM was created in 1992 by Claude Lecommandeur of EPFL from the source code for twm, which he extended to allow for virtual desktops ("workspaces" in CTWM's terminology), an innovative feature at the time for a window manager; his inspiration was vuewm, an early Unix desktop environment. Later additions and modifications have since changed the original twm codebase significantly, providing for a highly customizable user interface. The project is currently (2024) maintained by Matthew Fuller. CTWM has been the default graphical user interface for NetBSD since 2020 (release 9.1), replacing twm.

== Features ==
Features of the CTWM window manager include:

- Stacking windows
- Written in C
- Support for up to 32 virtual desktops
- Advanced icon management
- Optional animated icons and backgrounds
- Highly customizable
- 3D titles and borders
- Freely distributable under the MIT License
- Basic EWMH support (as of 4.0.0)
- Backwards-compatibility with twm
- XPM and JPEG images

== See also ==
- Comparison of X window managers
- Vtwm (a historically similar project)
