= Blackbox =

Free and open-source stacking window manager for the X Window System

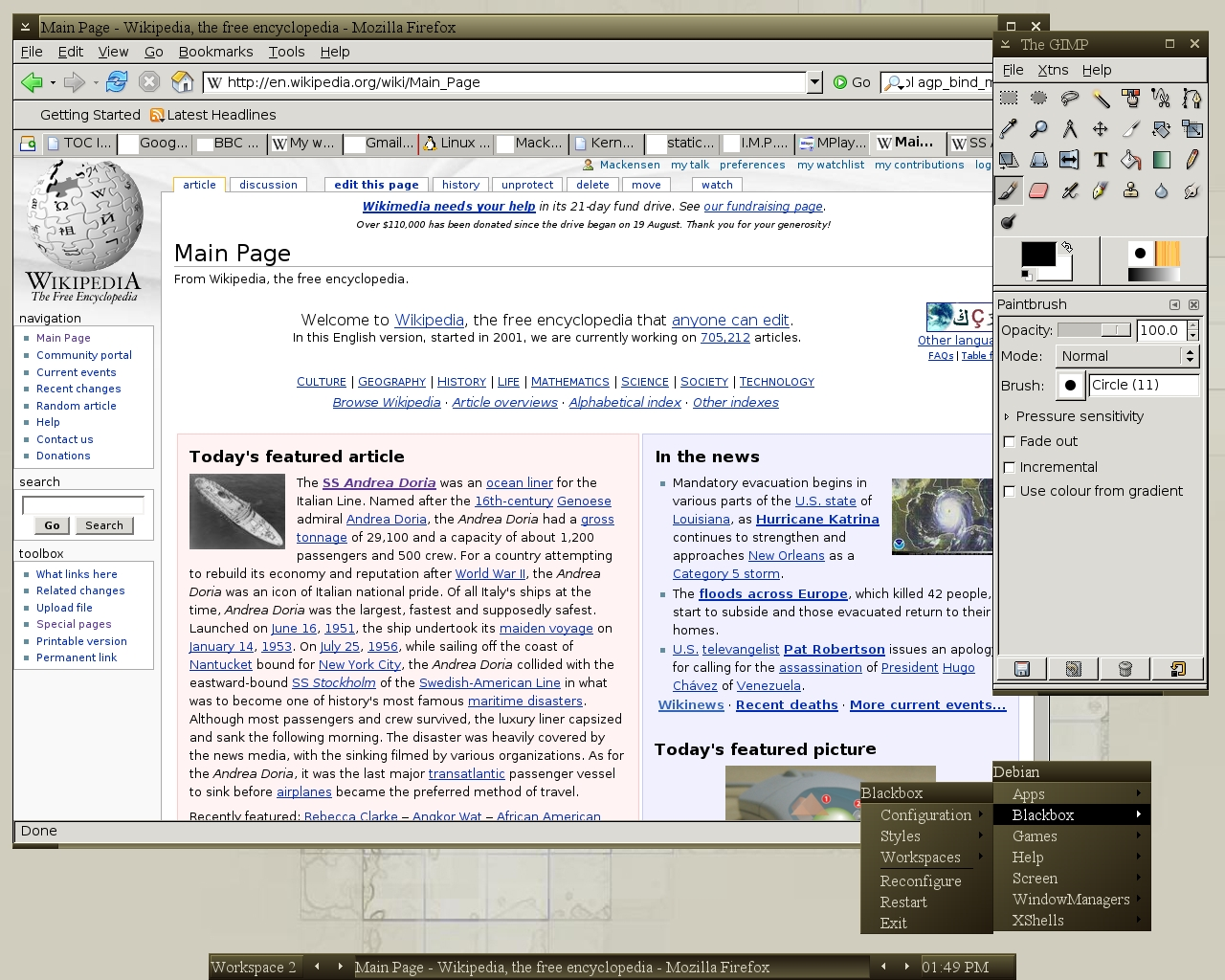
- Screenshot of Blackbox
- Developer: Bradley T. Hughes up to version 0.70.1_SL7, onwards forked by Brian Bidulock
- Stable release: 0.77 / 12 May 2021; 5 years ago
- Written in: C++
- Platform: Unix-like
- Type: X window manager
- License: MIT
- Website: Bradley T. Hughes' repository Repository of Brian Bidulock's fork
- Repository: github.com/bbidulock/blackboxwm

Blackbox 0.7 Xsession running on Debian 7 Linux

Blackbox is a free and open-source stacking window manager for the X Window System.

Blackbox has specific design goals, and some functionality is provided only through other applications. One example is the bbkeys hotkey application.

Blackbox is written in C++ and contains completely original code. It was created by Bradley T. Hughes and is available under the MIT License. Blackbox has compliance with the Extended Window Manager Hints specification.

The original author seems to have ceased updating the repository with the exception of a minor fix of compilation problems in 2015, leaving the last original version at 0.70.1. However an actively maintained fork by Brian Bidulock has been picked up by several Linux distributions in its place, and it is featured in pkgsrc. Despite that, some other Linux distributions still use the original source code, as does FreeBSD.

== Features ==
Features of the Blackbox window manager include:

- A stacking window manager
- Written in C++
- Freely available under the MIT license
- Compliance with the Extended Window Manager Hints Specification
- Title bars have minimize, maximize, and close buttons
- Support for simple themes
- Support for color changes
- No support for desktop shortcuts
- Compatibility with both KDE and GNOME

== Related projects ==
There are a number of other window manager forks of Blackbox:

- Fluxbox
- Hackedbox
- Openbox (until version 3.0)

=== Windows shell replacements ===
Although they do not share the same codebase, these projects are also inspired by Blackbox.

- BB4Win (the first and most prominent clone/port of Blackbox on Windows)
- bbLean
- xoblite (has releases from 2021)
- bbZero (a branch of bbLean)

== See also ==
- Comparison of X window managers
