= Ardent Window Manager =

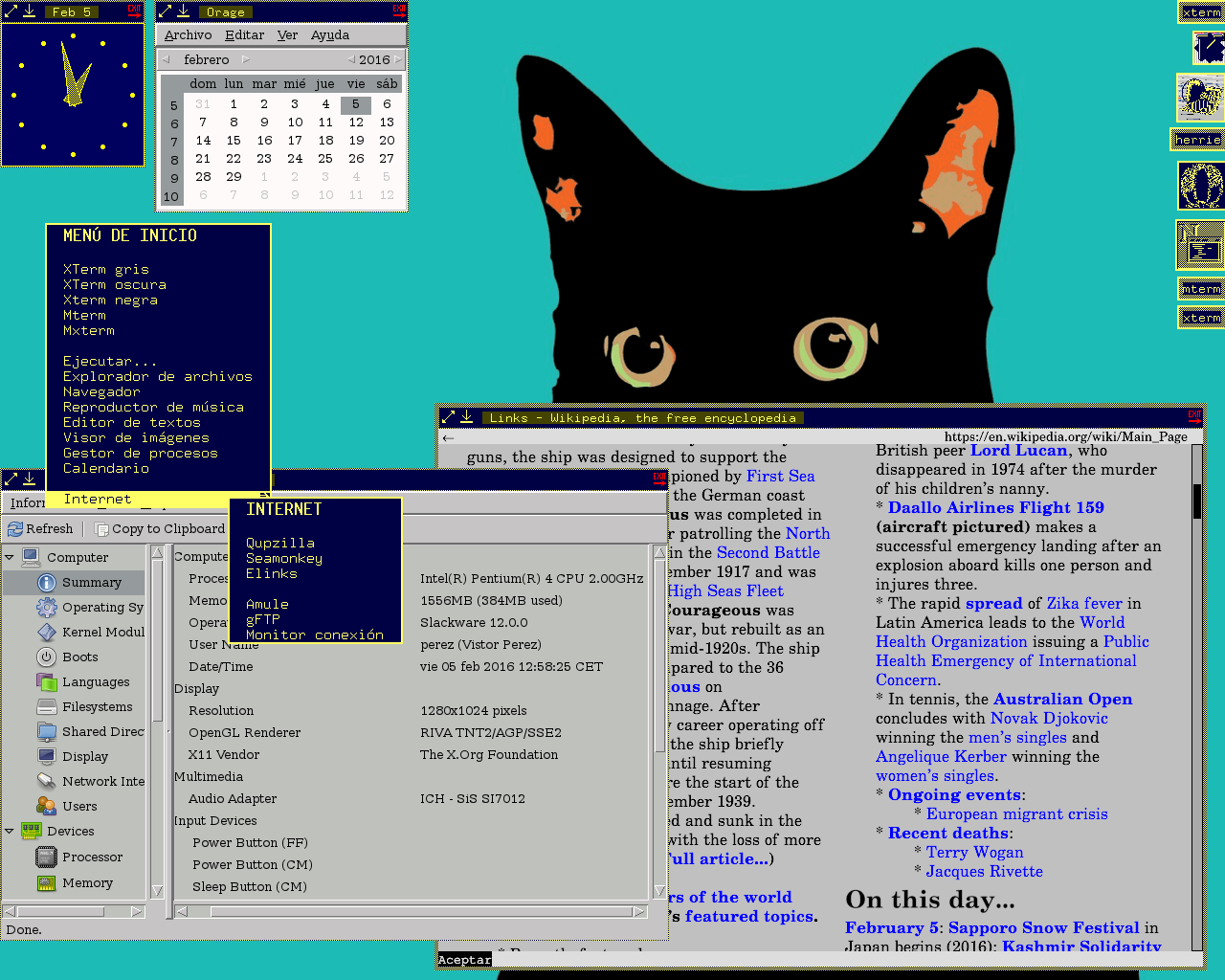
- AWM desktop
- Developer(s): Jordan Hubbard
- Stable release: 2pl9 / February 8, 1989; 36 years ago
- Written in: C
- Operating system: Unix Unix-like
- Type: Window manager

In computing, the Ardent Window Manager (awm) is an early window manager software for the X Window System. It was descended from uwm.

awm was written by Jordan Hubbard for the Ardent Computer Corporation's TITAN line of workstations in 1988, which ran a version of X11R2. It was included on the X11R3 contrib tape.

The FAQ for the comp.windows.x Usenet newsgroup says: The Ardent Window Manager was for a while a hotbed for hackers and offered some features (dynamic menus) not found on more current window managers.
