= Vtwm =

Window manager software

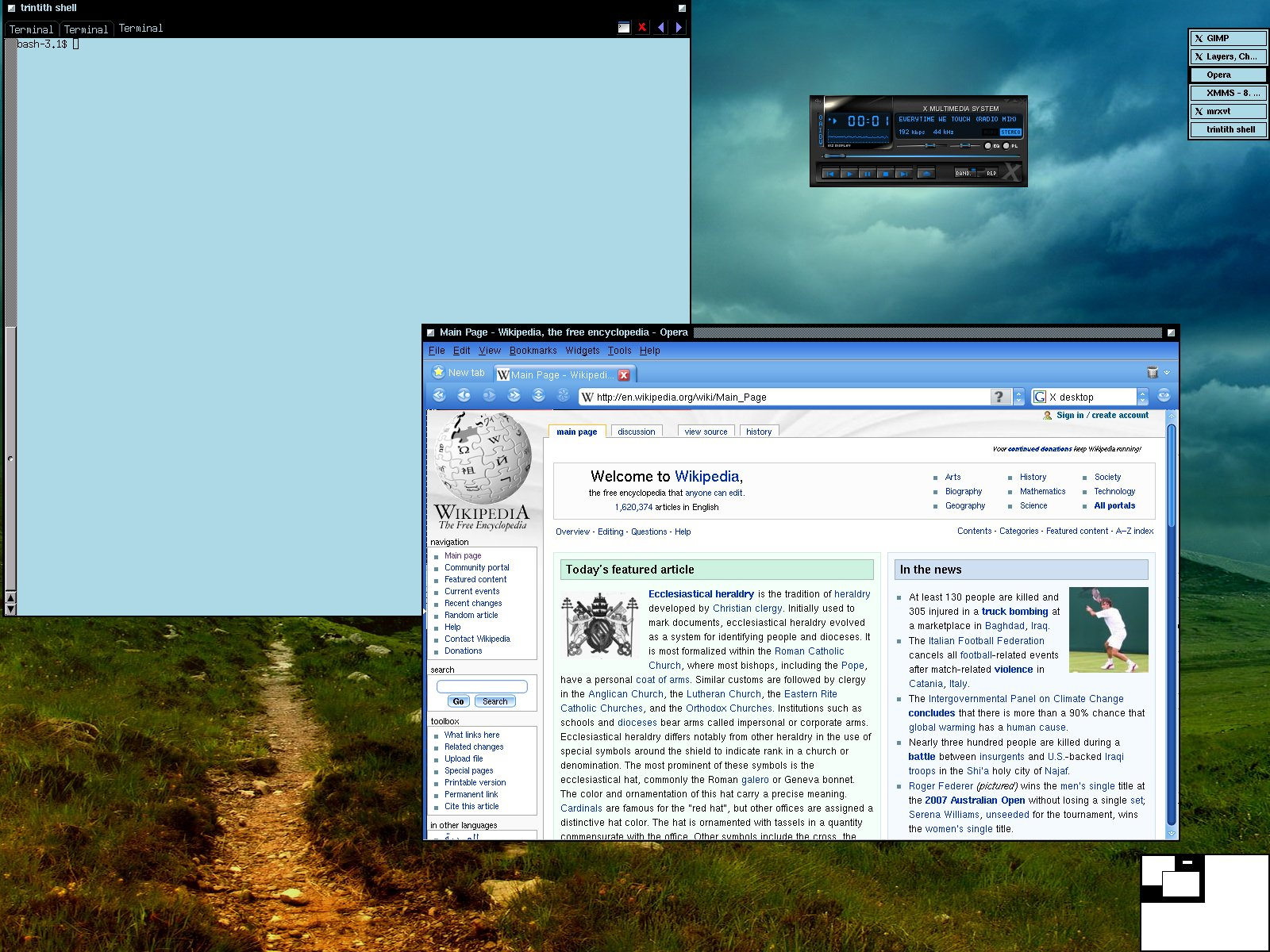
A screen shot of Vtwm in LFS running mrxvt, xmms and the Opera web browser

Vtwm (the Virtual Tabbed Window Manager) is an X window manager that was developed from the twm codebase. The first release was in 1990, and it is very much an "old school" window manager, lacking desktop environment features. It added features like xpm icons, autoraising of windows, and a virtual desktop; the latter feature is from where the program takes its name. Later additions include playing sounds in response to window manager events, and Motif-style window decorations in place of the "flat," 2D titlebars commonly associated with twm.

Vtwm was one of the first window managers to have an icon manager, a box of clickable windows which mapped to the application windows currently on the desktop. Clicking the entry in the icon manager iconizes or deiconizes the associated application. This behavior is common today in taskbars in many operating systems.

Vtwm is released under the MIT license.

== Features ==
- A stacking window manager
- Written in C
- Uses the xlib toolkit
- opensource and freely available
- No menubar
- Lightweight - Has few dependencies
- Support for multiple desktops

Other features of twm, including shaped window titlebars, are faithfully incorporated into vtwm.

The focus of vtwm is to maintain simplicity and compatibility. It is believed to still work under X Window System revision 4, and can be compiled and run with no dependencies beyond the standard X libraries.

== See also ==
- CTWM (a historically similar project, still active)
