= TOPdesk =

- Founded: 1997
- Headquarters: Netherlands
- Key people: Wolter Smit; Frank Droogsma
- Products: Software and services
- Number of employees: 700 (2026)
- Website: topdesk.com

TOPdesk is a developer and supplier of service management software from Delft, Netherlands, founded in 1997.

The company has more than 700 employees and has branches in more than 8 countries. TOPdesk focuses primarily on organizations in the medium-sized and large companies and non-profit organizations in the healthcare, higher education and (national) government sectors. The company was originally an ITSM solution, but nowadays also helps its customers with shared services and Enterprise Service Management (ESM).

== History ==
TOPdesk was founded by Frank Droogsma and Wolter Smit. Droogsma and Smit started developing the application TOPdesk in 1993, in an attic in Delft, the Netherlands, while working as developers at OGD IT services. In 1997, TOPdesk became a separate company and moved into a larger office.

In 2004, the company opened its first branch abroad in Kaiserslautern, Germany. Over the years, the company has opened offices in London, UK (2005), Antwerp, Belgium (2007), Budapest, Hungary (2009), Sao Paulo, Brazil (2013), Orlando, US (2015), Richmond Hill, Canada (2015), Manchester, UK (2015), Oslo, Norway (2017) and Charleroi. In 2012, TOPdesk opened a branch in Ballerup, Denmark after acquiring the company Aventor. It was the first time TOPdesk acquired an existing company and competitor.

In 2017, TOPdesk opened an office in Tilburg, the Netherlands. This is the second office in the Netherlands, focusing only on developing the software. In 2015, the company won third prize for best employer in the Netherlands.
