= Patrick Peter Chan =

Canadian computer scientist

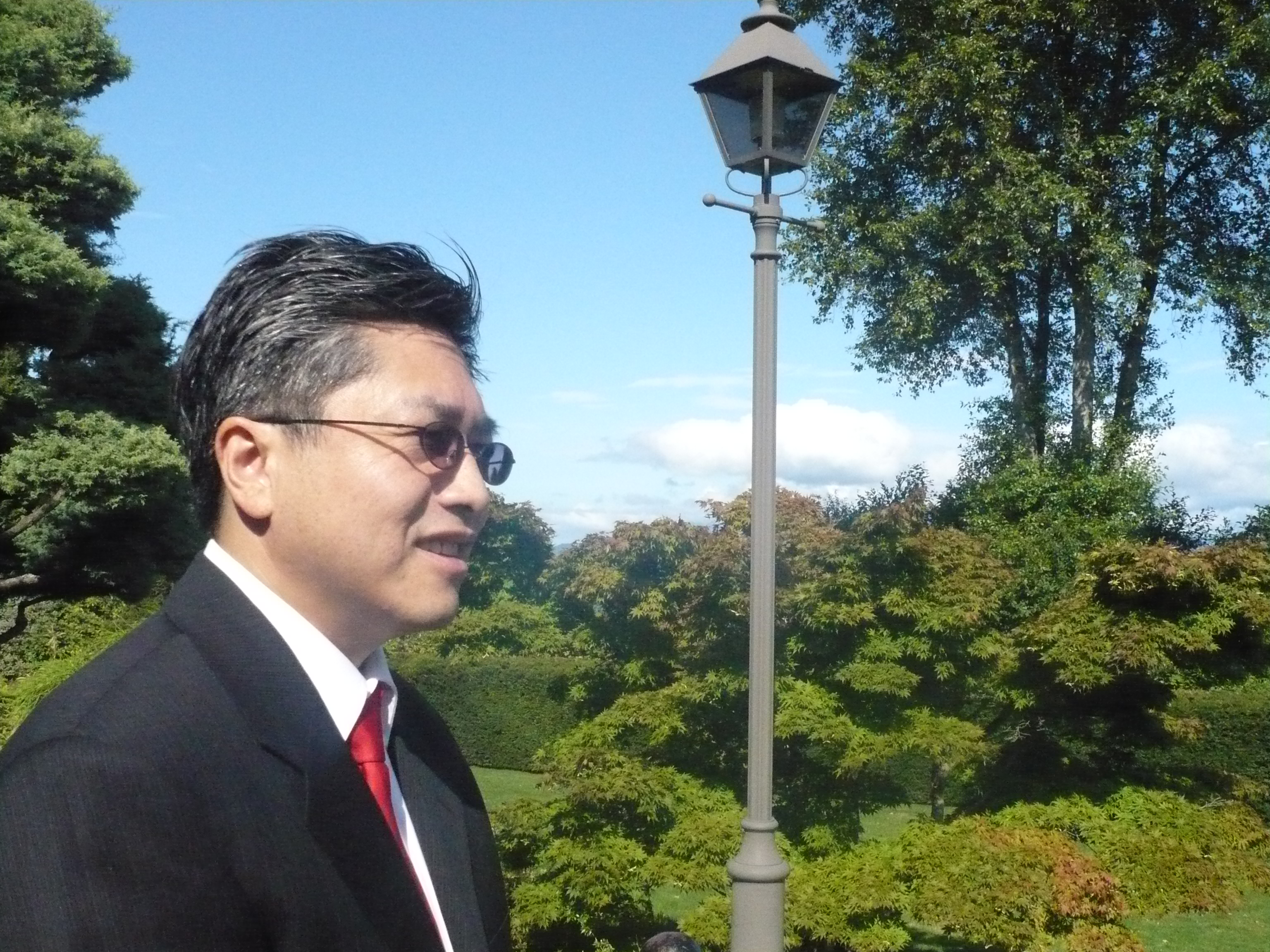
- Born: Vancouver, British Columbia, Canada
- Education: University of British Columbia, University of Waterloo
- Occupation: Computer Scientist
- Employer: Composite Software
- Known for: Java Almanac
- Title: VP of Engineering

Patrick Peter Chan is a Canadian computer scientist based in Silicon Valley, California. Born in Vancouver, British Columbia, he attended the University of British Columbia, and the University of Waterloo. He holds a master's in Computer Science and has made some contributions to the field.

== Education and career ==
Patrick Chan got a BS degree from the University of British Columbia before moving on to earn his MS degree at the University of Waterloo. He got his first job at his alma mater, UBC, before finding employment at Digital. After leaving Digital, he joined Sun Microsystems Inc. where he helped James Gosling create Java. He later moved to work at KMart's BlueLight.com as the company's CTO. He then worked as VP of Engineering of Composite Software, a San Mateo–based firm specializing in virtual database integration. Currently, he works at Twitter in San Francisco.

== Accomplishments & Awards ==
While best known for his Java Almanac and Java Class Libraries publications, Chan's most significant work was as a founding member and lead developer of the original Java platform project at Sun Microsystems, Inc. His publication "Rooms" was an early conception that paved the way for the implementation of virtual desktops. While working at BlueLight.com, he was recognized by InformationWeek Magazine as being one of the top 25 influential CTOs in 2000.

Chan was the winner of the 1998 Duke Award at JavaOne. In 2005, Chan earned a place in the 2006 World Settlers of Catan Championship by winning the qualifying tournament at the Origins Game Fair in Columbus, Ohio.

== Publications ==
- Patrick Chan, The Java Developers Almanac 1.4, Volume 1: Examples and Quick Reference, Prentice Hall PTR, 2002, ISBN 0-201-75280-8
