= Common menus in Microsoft Windows =

List of recently used files

This is a list of commonly used Microsoft Windows menus.

== Microsoft menus ==
=== Most Recently Used menu ===
A Most Recently Used (MRU) menu lists the programs or documents that were last accessed. It allows users to quickly see and access the last few used files and documents.

=== Properties menu ===
In Microsoft Windows, a properties page is a panel of information in the file properties dialogue (accessed from the File menu, context menu, or by typing alt-Enter, or alt-double-clicking.) It can be a built-in feature of Windows Explorer (for example, the file sharing page), or created by a shell extension (for example MP3ext or WinRAR))

=== System menu ===
The system menu (also called the window menu or control menu) is a popup menu in Microsoft Windows, accessible by left-clicking on the upper-left icon of most windows, or by pressing the Alt and Space keys. This menu provides the user with the ability to perform some common tasks on the window, some in atypical ways. For example, normally a user would move a window by dragging the title bar of the window - but with the option in the system menu the user gets a different cursor and procedure to move the window with.

Some applications customize the system menu, typically through the GetSystemMenu WinAPI function. The Win32 console, used e.g. by the Command Prompt (cmd.exe), is an example of this and offers the user an ability to change its preferences through its system menu (other applications typically offer the user to change their preferences through the normal menu below their window's title bar).
