= Inter-Client Communication Conventions Manual =

Standard protocol for the X Window System

In computing, the Inter-Client Communication Conventions Manual (ICCCM or I39L short for "I", 39 letters and "L") is a standard protocol for the X Window System. It specifies conventions for clients of a common X server about selections and cut buffers, communication with the window manager and session manager, manipulation of shared resources, and color characterization.

== History ==
It was designed by David S. H. Rosenthal of the MIT X Consortium from 1987 to 1989. A draft version appeared in March 1988 in X11R2. This was removed from X11R3. Version 1.0 was released in July 1989 as part of X11R4. Three window managers in the X11R4 contrib directory implemented support for ICCCM: gwm, olwm and tekwm. Version 1.1 contains an update for color characterization and appeared in X11R5. Version 2.0 has many changes in the areas of window management, selections, session management, and resource sharing. It was released in May 1994 as part of X11R6.

== Background ==
X deliberately specifies "mechanism, not policy" for how windows interact. As such, an additional specification beyond the X protocol itself was needed for client interoperation.

== Features ==
The ICCCM specifies cut and paste buffers, window manager interaction, session management, how to manipulate shared resources and how to manage device colours. These low-level functions are generally implemented within widget toolkits or desktop environments. This isolates application programmers from working directly with the ICCCM itself, as this functionality is delegated to the implementing toolkit.

== Criticism ==
The ICCCM has received some criticism for being ambiguous and difficult to implement correctly. This was acknowledged in the preface of version 2.0, stating that it aimed "to fix problems with earlier drafts, and to improve readability and understandability".

Furthermore, some parts may be obsolete or no longer practical to implement. The Extended Window Manager Hints (EWMH) is a more recent standard, which, according to its introduction: "builds on the ICCCM, which defines window manager interactions at a lower level. The ICCCM does not provide ways to implement many features that modern desktop users expect." But it also states: "Clients which aim to fulfill this specification MUST adhere to the ICCCM on which this specification builds." insofar the EWMH doesn't overrule.

Freedesktop.org notes that "historically, X clients have not handled cut-and-paste in a consistent way" and formulates additional guidelines in a Clipboard Spec.

== List of Window Managers that are ICCCM Compliant ==
- aewm — a stacking window manager.
- alloywm — partial compliance.
- awesome — a dynamic window manager that is configured in Lua.
- Blackbox
- Compiz
- CTWM
- dwm — can be configured for compliance
- enlightenment — also serves as a Wayland compositor.
- evilwm — partial compliance
- EXWM (Emacs X Window Manager) — features ICCCM and EWMH compliance
- FVWM
- IceWM
- KWin — default window manager and Wayland compositor of KDE Plasma.
- Metacity — default window manager of GNOME 2.
- musca
- Openbox — the default window manager used by LXDE and LXQt.
- vtwm
- wmfs
- xfwm
- xmonad
