= Swm =

X Window System window manager

swm (the Solbourne window manager) is an X Window System window manager developed by Tom LaStrange at Solbourne Computer in 1990. The most important innovation of swm was the introduction of the virtual desktop. It also introduced a primitive form of session management (restoring programs in use at the time of shutdown) to X.
