= VirtuaWin =

- Original author(s): Johan Piculell
- Initial release: March 19, 1999; 26 years ago
- Stable release: 4.5 / January 16, 2021; 4 years ago
- Written in: C
- Operating system: Microsoft Windows (2000/XP/Vista/7/10)
- Type: Virtual desktop manager
- License: GNU General Public License
- Website: virtuawin.sourceforge.net

VirtuaWin is an open source virtual desktop manager for Microsoft Windows systems. It allows the user to organize applications over several virtual desktops, providing the multiple-desktop feature present in Linux system to Windows users.

== Features ==
- The application runs in the background, and appears in the system tray. Keyboard shortcuts can be configured for direct access to each of the virtual desktops. Mouse desktop changing is also supported, by moving the mouse to the edge of a desktop.
- By clicking on the tray icon, the user may access some of the windows on another desktop, or make some window a "sticky" window - one that is present on each of the virtual desktops.
- The number of available virtual desktops may be configured up to 20, where 4 is the default setting.
- An API for external modules is provided, which can be downloaded and installed separately. External authors have contributed more than 20 modules to the project, e.g., an enhanced overview of desktops and windows by a pager, changing desktop wallpaper automatically, switching desktops via command line, tracking the time spent on each desktop, etc.
- A portable version for VirtuaWin is available, in addition to the regular installer.

== See also ==
- X window manager
- Spaces - Mac OS Virtual desktop manager
- Virtual desktop
- Desktop metaphor
- Virtual Desktop Grid Switcher - The contemporary alternative that uses the existing Windows 10 virtual desktops and extends their use and feel (to get some of the VirtuaWin features back)
