= Ultrix Window Manager =

Unix software

uwm
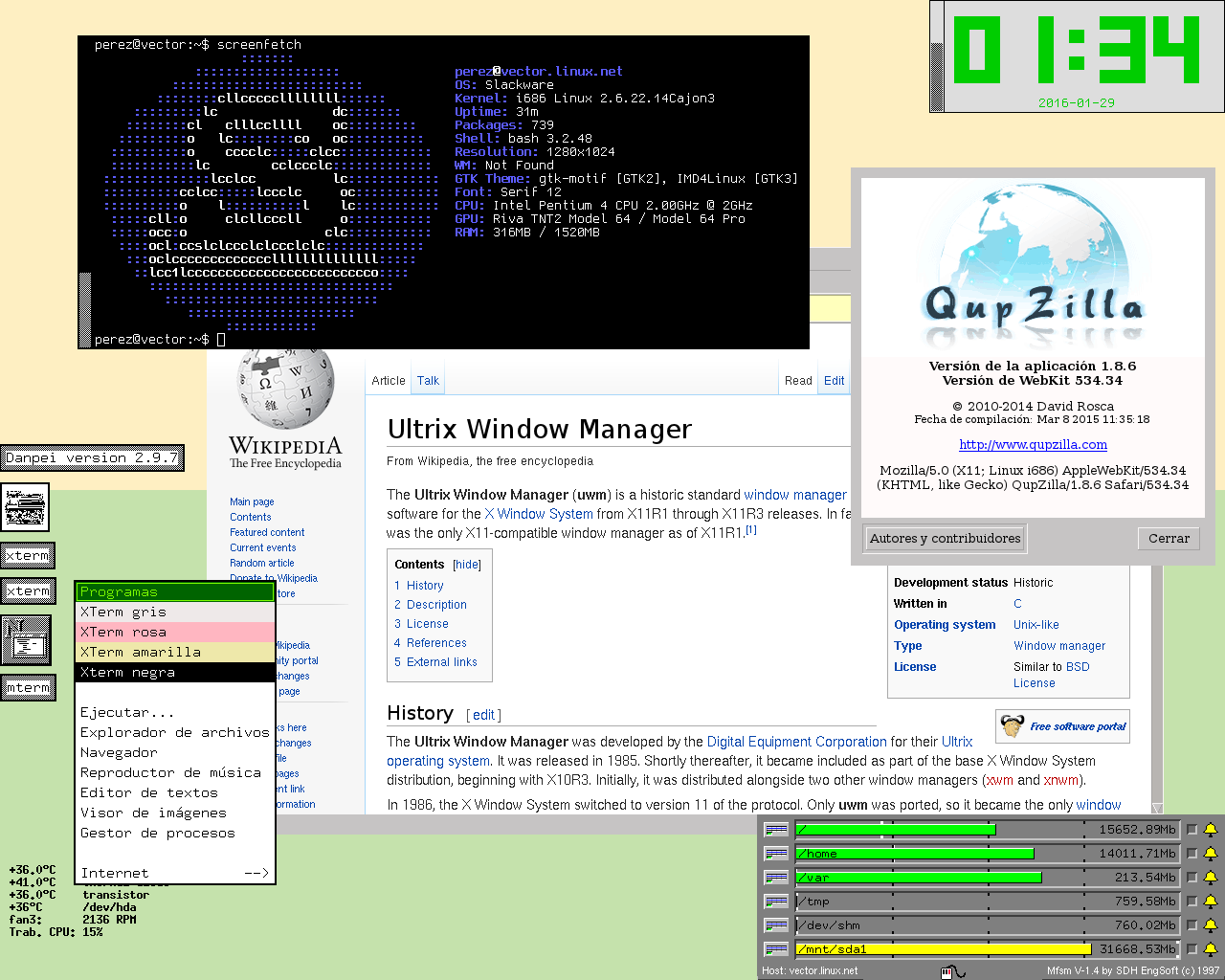
- Uwm running in Slackware Linux with several windows open.
- Original authors: Mike Gancarz, Bob Scheifler
- Release: 1985
- Written in: C
- Operating system: Unix-like
- Type: Window manager
- License: Similar to BSD License

The Ultrix Window Manager (uwm) is a historic standard window manager software for the X Window System from X11R1 through X11R3 releases. In fact, it was the only X11-compatible window manager as of X11R1.

== History ==
The Ultrix Window Manager was developed by the Digital Equipment Corporation for its Ultrix operating system. It was released in 1985. Shortly thereafter, it became included as part of the base X Window System distribution, beginning with X10R3. Initially, it was distributed alongside two other window managers (xwm and xnwm).

In 1986, the X Window System switched to version 11 of the protocol. Only uwm was ported, so it became the only window manager for X Window System until X11R4 release, where it was replaced by twm. Uwm has never been maintained since, although it has been patched for use in modern UNIX-like operating systems through the pkgsrc package manager.

== Description ==
Unlike more recent window managers, uwm is not re-parenting, and does not place frames or title bars on windows. Instead, all window management functionality is accessed either by clicking on the root window to bring up a menu or by holding down the Meta key while clicking or dragging within windows. It is possible to configure the key and mouse button bindings and the contents of the menus by using a configuration file, a feature inherited by many later window managers.

Uwm does not provide ICCCM compatibility or multiple screen support.

Descendants of uwm include awm and Tekwm (the Tektronix Window Manager), which also are currently not maintained.
