= Virtual desktop =

User interfaces describe ways in which virtual space of a computer's desktop is expanded

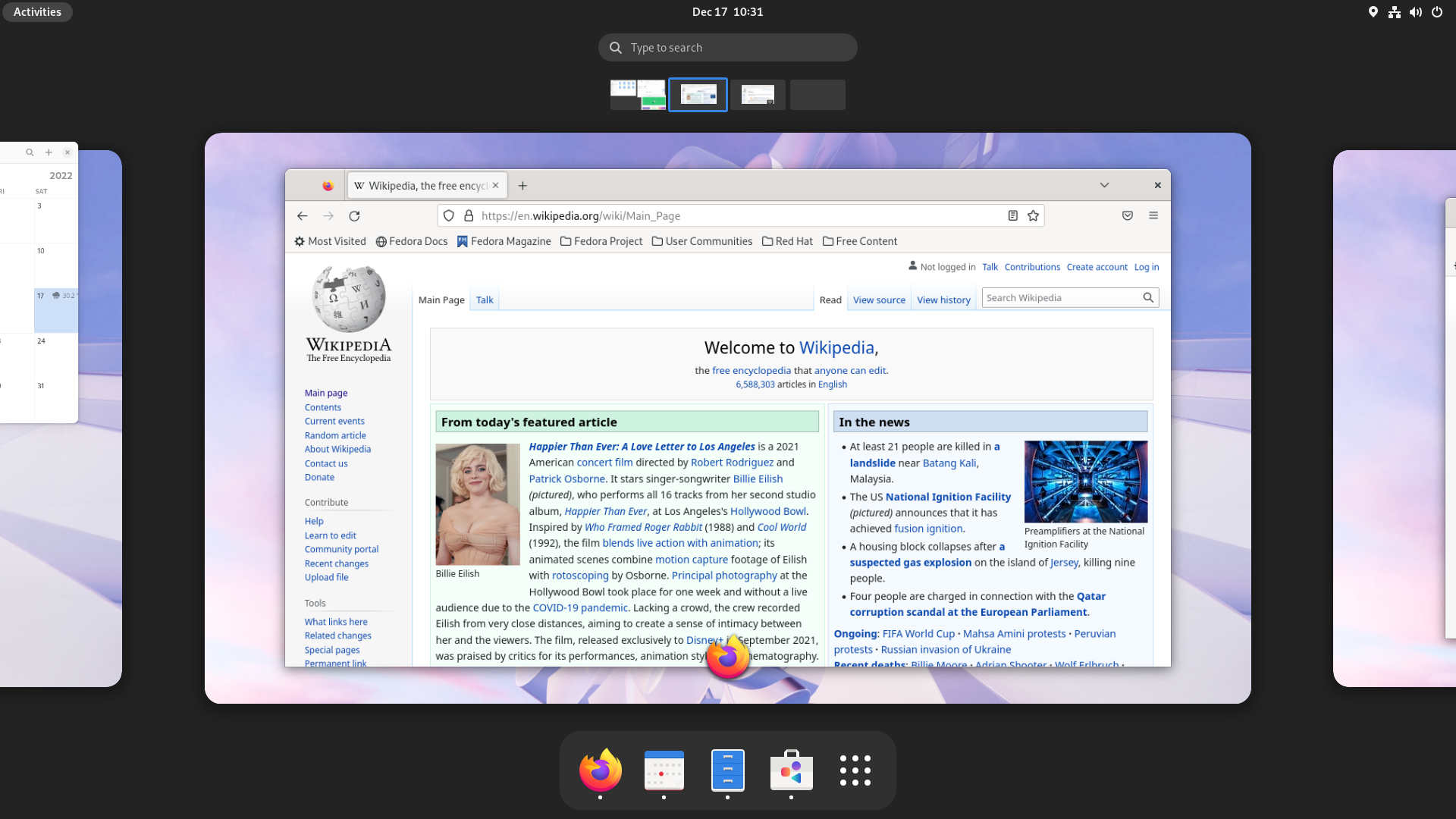
Dynamic virtual desktops in GNOME Shell v40. Workspaces are automatically added or deleted as the existing ones are respectively consumed or freed.

In computing, a virtual desktop is a term used with respect to user interfaces, usually within the WIMP paradigm, to describe ways in which the virtual space of a computer's desktop environment is expanded beyond the physical limits of the screen's display area through the use of software. This compensates limits of the desktop area and is helpful in reducing clutter of running graphical applications.

== Overview ==
Switchable desktops were designed and implemented at Xerox PARC as "Rooms" by Austin Henderson and Stuart Card in 1986 and (unknowingly to the authors until their publication) was conceptually similar to earlier work by Patrick Peter Chan in 1984. This work was covered by a US patent.

Switchable desktops were introduced to a much larger audience by Tom LaStrange in swm (the Solbourne Window Manager, for the X Window System) in 1989. ("Virtual Desktop" was originally a trademark of Solbourne Computer.) Rather than simply being placed at an x, y position on the computer's display, windows of running applications are then placed at x, y positions on a given virtual desktop “context”. They are then only accessible to the user if that particular context is enabled. A switching desktop provides a pager for the user to switch between "contexts", or pages of screen space, only one of which can be displayed on the computer's display at any given time. Several X window managers provide switching desktops.

== Implementation ==
Virtual desktop managers are available for most graphical user interface operating systems and offer various features, such as placing different wallpapers for each virtual desktop and use of hotkeys or other convenient methods to allow the user to switch amongst the different screens.

=== Unix and Unix-like systems ===
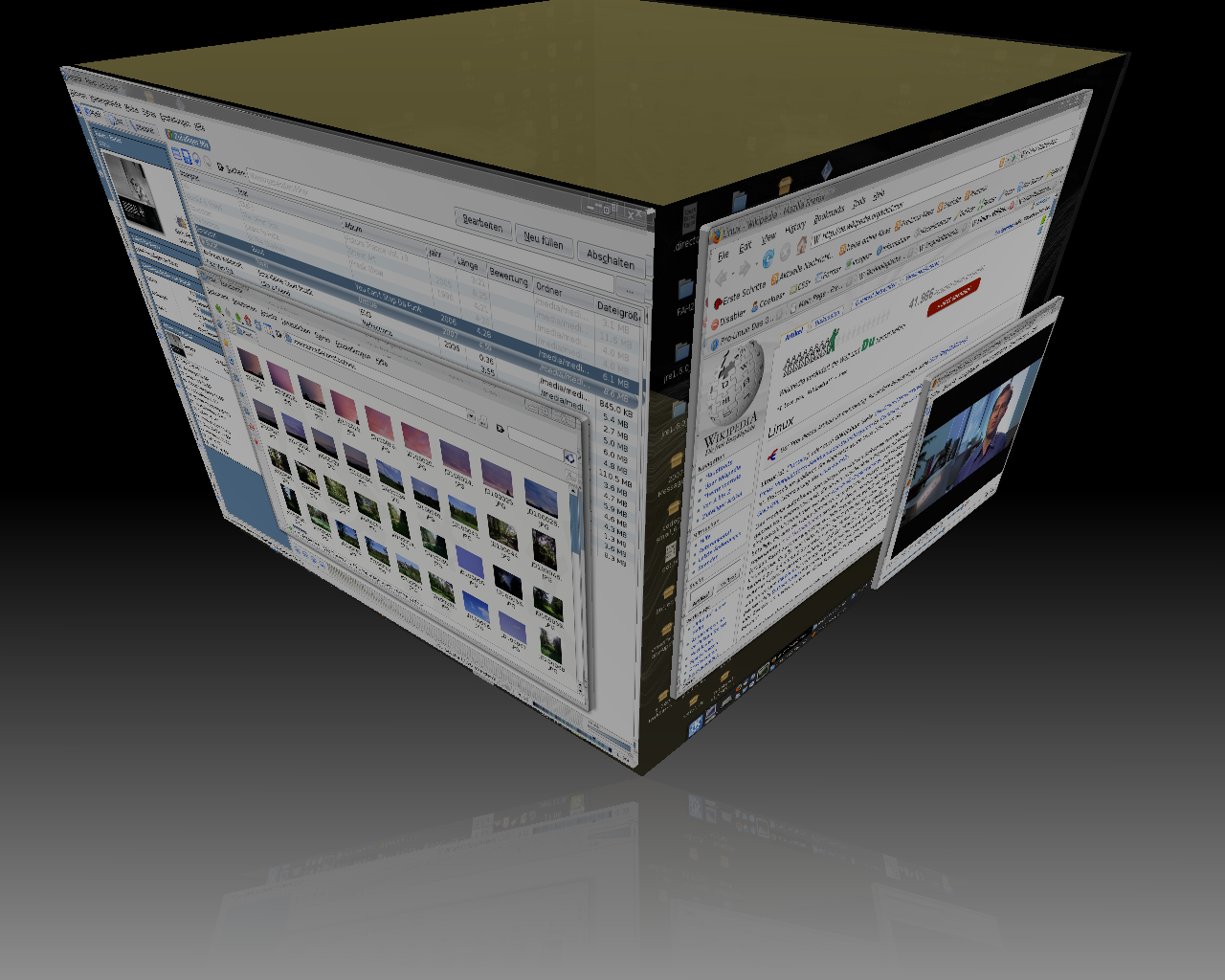
Virtual desktops rendered as the faces of a cube using the Compiz cube plugin.

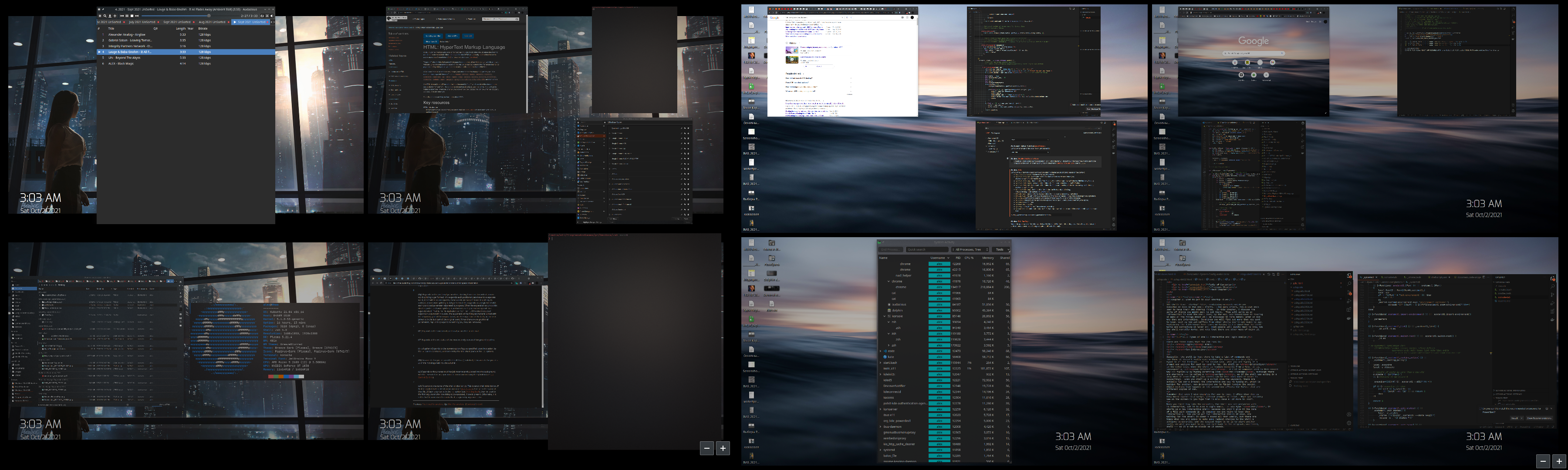
Kubuntu 21.04 (KDE Plasma 5) multiple displays and virtual desktops arrangement with a compositing window manager. The theme (grid) is non-default and highly configurable.

Almost all Unix and Unix-like systems use either the X Window System or the Wayland protocol to provide their windowing environment, with the latter becoming more prevalent on Linux-based systems as of the early 2020s. These systems are unique in that the decoration, placement, and management of windows are handled by a separate, replaceable program known as a window manager on the former or a compositor on the latter. This separation allowed third-party developers to introduce a host of different window manager features, resulting in the early development of virtual desktop capabilities in X. The first implementation of virtual desktops for Unix was vtwm in 1990. IXI Limited's Panorama was an early example of a commercial virtual desktop product for Unix. Many of today's X window managers and Wayland compositors now include virtual desktop capabilities.

Configurations range from as few as two virtual desktops to several hundred. The most popular desktop environments, GNOME and KDE, use multiple virtual desktops called workspaces. These may exist in a fixed number or be created on the fly as they are populated. Some window managers, like FVWM, offer separate "desks" that allow the user to organize applications even further. For example, a user may have separate desks labeled "Work" and "Home", with the same programs running on both desks, but fulfilling different functions. Some window managers such as dwm and Sawfish support "tagging" (or window rules for KDE) where applications can be configured to always launch on a particular desktop, screen, and position, supporting automatic organization and consistent navigation.

==== macOS ====
Despite its Unix underpinnings, macOS does not use the X Window System for its GUI, and early versions had no provision for virtual desktops. Beginning with Mac OS X 10.5 Leopard in late 2007, macOS has shipped with native virtual desktop support, called Spaces, which allows up to 16 virtual desktops. It allows the user to associate applications with a particular "Space". As of OS X 10.7 Lion, this functionality has been moved into Mission Control.

=== Windows ===
Virtual desktop in Windows 11 showing four open apps in the same desktop, with a thumbnail showing another desktop

Windows 10 and 11 offer virtual desktops through a system known as "Task View". It allows a user to quickly locate an open window, quickly hide all windows and show the desktop, and to manage windows across multiple monitors or virtual desktops. Clicking the Task View button on the taskbar or swiping from the left side of the screen displays all open windows and allows users to switch between them, or switch between multiple workspaces. It can also be accessed through the keyboard shortcut ⊞ Win+Tab ↹.

Task View was first previewed on September 30, 2014, at a Windows 10 press event in downtown San Francisco. A redesigned Task View with support for giving different wallpapers on each desktop has been introduced in Windows 11.

Prior to Windows 10, Microsoft Windows did not implement virtual desktops natively in a user-accessible way. There are objects in the architecture of Windows known as "desktop objects" that are used to implement separate screens for logon and the secure desktop sequence (Ctrl+Alt+Delete). There is no native and easy way for users to create their own desktops or populate them with programs. However, there are many third-party (e.g. VirtuaWin, Dexpot and others) and some partially supported Microsoft products that implement virtual desktops to varying degrees of completeness.

Microsoft offers a utility called Desktops which allows users running Windows Vista or Windows Server 2008 or later operating systems to run applications on up to 4 virtual desktops. Unlike nearly all other virtual desktop solutions for Windows, this utility actually uses native "desktop objects," as discussed above. Because of this, it does not offer the ability to move programs between desktops, or in fact to stop using virtual desktops at all, short of logging off, and Windows Aero only works on the primary desktop object.

Microsoft had previously provided a Virtual Desktop PowerToy for Windows XP, which simulates many desktops with the more common method of hiding and showing windows in groups, each group being a different desktop. However, the functionality provided is less comprehensive than that of many other virtual desktop solutions (e. g. maintain a window in a given desktop even when its application bar button flashes, etc.). As with all virtual desktop utilities that work by hiding and showing windows, application compatibility problems are common, because application developers do not expect virtual desktops to be in use on the Windows platform.

Historically, software packaged with some video card drivers provided virtual desktop functionality, such as in Nvidia's nView product (this product has been discontinued for GeForce card owners since Vista). Some of these programs provide eye-candy features similar to those available on Compiz.

Many desktop shell replacements for Windows, including LiteStep, Emerge Desktop and others, also support virtual desktops via optional modules.

=== Amiga ===
The first platform to implement multiple desktop display as a hardware feature was Amiga 1000, released in 1985. All Amigas supported multiple in-memory screens displayed concurrently via the use of the graphics co-processor, AKA the "Copper". The Copper was a simple processor that could wait for a screen position and write to hardware registers. Using the GUI implemented in system ROM API's, programs could transparently display multiple independent screens, from non-consecutive memory, without moving the memory. This hardware-based scrolling does not use blitting, but something more like what is sometimes called hardware panning. The video output is simply told (once, or many times) where to display (scanline) and from what screen memory address. A screen can move to any position, or display any portion, by modifying the wait, or fetch position. Typically a single byte value. The Copperlist did need to be sorted in vertical and horizontal wait position in order to function.

Each desktop or 'screen' could have its own color depth (number of available colors) and resolution, including use of interlacing. The display chipset ('graphics card' on a PC) could switch between these desktop modes on the fly, and during the drawing of a single screen, usually with three pixel deep line between each desktop shown on the screen. However, if one interlaced (flickering) desktop was displayed, all desktops onscreen would be similarly affected.

This also allowed the OS to seamlessly mix "Full Screen" and Windowed "desktop"-style applications in a single environment.

Some programs, VWorlds (an astronomy simulator) being an example, used the multiple desktops feature to overlay a set of controls over the main display screen. The controls could then be dragged up and down in order to show more or less of the main display.

=== OS/2 ===
IBM's personal computer OS/2 operating system included multiple desktops (up to 4 natively) in the OS/2 Warp 4 release in 1996. This functionality has also been provided by the open source XWorkplace project, with support for up to 100 virtual desktops. XWorkplace is included with the ArcaOS distribution of OS/2.

=== Classic Mac OS ===
On the classic Mac OS, scrolling desktops were made available to Macintosh users by a 3rd party extension called Stepping Out created by Wes Boyd (the future founder of Berkeley Systems) in 1986. The code for this extension was integrated by Apple into a later version of the Mac OS, although the ability to create virtual desktops larger than the screen was removed. The code was used instead as an assist for visually impaired users to zoom into portions of the desktop and view them as larger, more easily discerned images.

=== BeOS ===
BeOS included an implementation of virtual desktops called "Workspaces". Up to 32 different Workspaces were supported.
