= Wisconsin Computer Club =

Hobbyist organization based in Stevens Point, Wisconsin

- Abbreviation: WCC
- Founded
- Founder: Alex Macomber
- Type: Hobbyist club
- Purpose: Vintage computers, retro computing, retro video game consoles
- Location: Stevens Point, Wisconsin
- Region served: Wisconsin
- President: Alex Macomber
- Website: wisconsincomputerclub.com

The Wisconsin Computer Club (WCC) is a hobbyist organization based in Stevens Point, Wisconsin, devoted to vintage computers, retro video game consoles, and other obsolete technology. Its members restore and collect older hardware and display it to the public, most often at free "pop-up museum" events hosted by public libraries and historical societies around the state.

== History ==
The club was founded by Alex Macomber, who also serves as its president.

In 2021 the club drew local attention for a fundraising effort tied to a proposed RoboCop statue in Stevens Point, hometown of RoboCop star Peter Weller. After the city was unable to purchase an existing version of the statue from Detroit, fundraising began for a 3D-printed replica. The club organized a retro video game competition in which players competed for the high score in RoboCop 2 on the Commodore 64. The event used donated computers and antique consoles, the winner received a trophy dubbed the "RoboCup", and Stevens Point mayor Mike Wiza backed the statue effort.

== Activities ==
=== Open houses and pop-up museums ===
By 2022, the club was holding quarterly open houses, including one at the Portage County Library in Stevens Point, where members displayed vintage computers and game consoles. Macomber described the goal as giving members a chance to show off favorite pieces or projects they were working on and to share them with the community. Equipment on display ranged from 1970s Pong consoles and TRS-80 computers to 1980s machines such as the Commodore 64 and Apple II, much of it salvaged, and Macomber noted that failing batteries, capacitors, and chips make upkeep a large part of the hobby.

The club has since run hands-on "pop-up vintage technology museum" events at public libraries across Wisconsin. These are free and open to all ages, and include shows at the Hedberg Public Library in Janesville and the Fond du Lac Public Library.

=== Partnerships ===
The club has partnered with the Marathon County Historical Society on Vintage Video Game Night events at the Woodson History Center in Wausau, including one on November 6, 2026. In 2024 it co-presented LaserDisc movie screenings with Cinema in the Pines in Stevens Point, including Raiders of the Lost Ark and Back to the Future, with Macomber explaining the format and its history.

=== Online community ===
The club runs an online forum with sections for platforms including Amiga, Apple, Atari, Commodore, Tandy/Radio Shack, PC, and arcade hardware, along with an event calendar and buy/sell areas. The forum also hosts the club's CRT television and monitor preservation effort, which aims to return disused displays to enthusiasts.

== See also ==
- Vintage Computer Festival
- Retrocomputing
