= Commodore 64x =

Personal computer

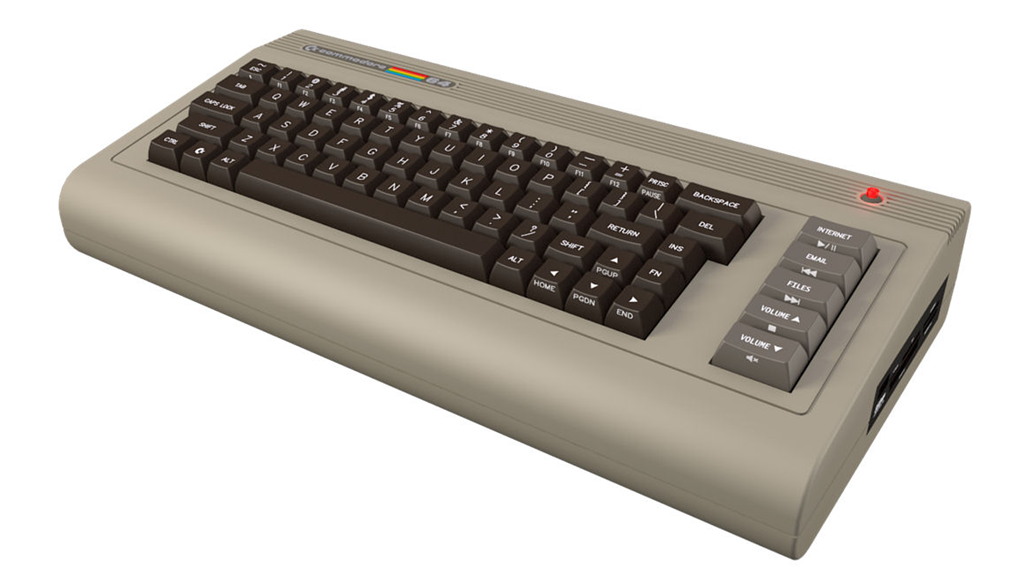
- Hardware
- Type: Home computer
- Released: April 2011; 15 years ago
- Introductory price: US $295–895 (April 2011)
- Discontinued: 2013–2022
- Operating system: Ubuntu 10.10 / Commodore OS
- CPU: Dual-core Intel Atom D525 @ 1.80 GHz (Ultimate), Intel Core i7 @ 2.2 GHz Sandy Bridge (Extreme)
- Memory: 2 GB RAM expandable to 4 GB (DDR2 667/800 single-channel) (Ultimate), 8 GB expandable to 16 GB 2 × SO-DIMM DDR3 1066/1333 dual channel(Extreme)
- Storage: 1 TB hard drive (Ultimate), 3 TB (Extreme)
- Graphics: Nvidia Ion 2 with 512 MB memory, Intel HD Graphics (Extreme)
- Sound: Realtek ALC662 6-CH HD Audio Nvidia L-PCM digital audio (HDMI 1.3); can support 7.1 output with external decoder (Ultimate)
- Connectivity: mini PCI Express x1 Slot, RS-232 serial header, 4 SATA Revision 2.0 3 Gb / s Connectors with RAID 0, 1, JBOD functions (SATA#3,#4), 8 bit GPIO header, CIR header, 9-pin Audio Connector, Front Panel Connector, Fan Headers, 4-pin power connector, 12V DC jack, 1 × PS2 KB / Mouse connectors, 1 × HDMI, 1 × DVI-D, 1 × VGA, 4 × USB 2.0, 1 × RJ45 LAN (10 / 100 / 1000), 3 × 3.5 mm Audio with S/PDIF out, WiFi N (Ultimate), mini PCI Express x1 Slot, RS-232 / RS432 / RS-485 serial header, 2 × SATA Revision 3.0 6Gb / s connectors, 3 SATA Revision 2.0 3 Gb / s with RAID 0, 1, 5, JBOD functions (SATA#3,#4), 8-bit GPIO header, 9-pin Audio Connector, 24-pin ATX power connector, 12V DC jack, Front Panel Connector, fan headers, 4-pin power connector, 1 × PS2 KB / mouse connector, 1 × HDMI, 1 × DVI-D, 1 × VGA, 4 x USB 2.0, 3 × USB 3.0, 1 × RJ45 LAN, 3 × 3.5 mm Audio with S/PDIF out, WiFi N (Extreme)
- Weight: 3.1 kg
- Website: www.commodoreusa.net

The Commodore 64x is a replica PC based on the original Commodore 64, powered by x86 Intel processors ranging from the Intel Atom to the Intel Core i7. It was initially sold by Commodore USA starting in April 2011. The production was discontinued in 2012 and ceased in 2013 with the closure of Commodore USA following the death of its founder, Barry Altman. It was revived by the community and enthusiasts, and by My Retro Computer, which resold a version 2 of the product under the Commodore brand. Subsequently, in June 2025, with the founding of the new Commodore International Corporation, which owns all the trademarks of the old Commodore International Corporation, a version 3 of the product was sold.

== History ==
=== Version 1 – Commodore USA (2010-2013) ===
The case of the C64x was designed to resemble the popular Commodore 64 in response to "overwhelming demand" from Commodore USA's customer base. Volume production started in May 2011, with machines being released on to the market in June 2011 at a starting price of US $595 for the Basic model and up to US $895 for an Ultimate model, and as of August 13, an Extreme version fitted with an Intel Core i7 chip with 8 GB DDR3 RAM and 3 TB hard drive for US $1499. There was a case-only version of the C64x called the Barebones available for US $295. It shipped initially with Ubuntu 10.10 Desktop Edition, and in November 2011, Commodore USA released their own Linux derivative called Commodore OS. However, Commodore OS Vision 1.0 was never released, and remained in its last version 1.0beta9 before the founder's death and the company's closure.

=== Version X – Unofficial or Homebrew (2013-2021) ===
With the cessation of official production in 2012, the product remained the prerogative of the community and enthusiasts and lost the official Commodore branding. Support for version 1.0 was provided unofficially by former Commodore USA employees from 2013 to 2016. After 2017, version 1 is no longer supported, either officially or unofficially. However, in 2026, Commodore 64X Drivers, Firmware & Manuals for version 1 are still available on the community-created page. These versions, called X, are customized in hardware and software, but maintain a non-official Commodore branded case, and have evolved over time with the passion of enthusiasts. Commodore OS Vision was no longer updated or developed during this period.

=== Version 2 – My Retro Computer (2021-2025) ===
In 2021, Commodore USA's spiritual successor, My Retro Computer Ltd., announced a Kickstarter campaign to bring back the Commodore 64x. The UK-based My Retro Computer, which purchased the injection molds from the Altman's heirs, want revived the product. After initial opposition to the crowdfunding campaign by Commodore Engineering, another Italian company that holds the rights to the Commodore brand, the campaign continued, also with the approval of this company, and was successful. The crowdfunding achieving Kickstarter's Project We Love status. In 2022, My Retro Computer made the Commodore C64X available again in three configurations: Ultimate, Extreme and Bareones. Ultimate sold for $999 for VIP and $1099 for early bird, Extreme for $399 for VIP and $456 for early bird, and finally Bareones, the cheapest version, for $119 for VIP and $135 for early bird. Leo Nigro, former CTO of Commodore USA and originally responsible for the operating system, was involved in the project for this new version. In 2023 a new version of the Commodore 64x was released with new 2.0 release of the Commodore OS. This new version receives both hardware and software updates.

=== Version 3 – Commodore International (2025-present) ===
On April 22, 2025, version 3 of the Commodore OS was released, again by Leo Nigro, who is still involved in the development of the project. The project, which is increasingly gaining popularity among enthusiasts, allows for the creation of the conditions for the creation of a new Commodore company. Subsequently, in June 2025, with the founding of the new Commodore International Corporation, which acquired and held the rights to the brand and which also included Leo Nigro as co-founder, the project returned to the Commodore brand permanently. As of April 2026, 15 years after its initial release, the Commodore 64x with Commodore OS Vision is currently an asset of Commodore International Corporation. In 2026, the Commodore 64X PC with OS Vision 3.0 was sold with new hardware components from an official partner of Commodore International Corporation; it was possible to choose between a basic version and a more powerful version, or to assemble one yourself.

== Software ==
Commodore OS desktop

In April 2011, It shipped initially with Ubuntu 10.10 Desktop Edition, and in November 2011, Commodore USA released their own Linux derivative called Commodore OS, that it was originally based on Linux Mint until 1.0-beta9. A 1.0.0 version was never released and remained in beta until the latest beta build, 1.0-beta9 released in July 2012. With the closure of the company Commodore USA no longer receives official development and support. Version 2.0 was released on December 13, 2023 and was based on an unofficial spin of MX Linux. Leo Nigro, former CTO of Commodore USA and originally responsible for the operating system, has released this new version 2.0 which used MATE as desktop environment and VICE 3.5.0, for the emulation of the Commodore 64. Version 3 was released on April 22, 2025 and used MATE as desktop environment and VICE 3.7.1. In Commodore OS Vision 3.0, a modern BASIC implementation is included as Commodore OS BASIC V1. Commodore OS Vision 3.1 will released in 2026. Commodore OS is a 64-bit Linux OS and does not support 32-bit hardware as it did with version 1. It can be installed free of charge on other PCs as well as the Commodore C64x. Commodore OS Vision 3.0 required an installation partition size of at least 90GB. Commodore OS Vision 3.1 requires at least 30GB.

== See also ==
- Retrocomputing
- Retrofuturism
- Linux
- Commodore 64
- AmigaOS
