= Lazy Game Reviews =

American YouTuber (born 1986)

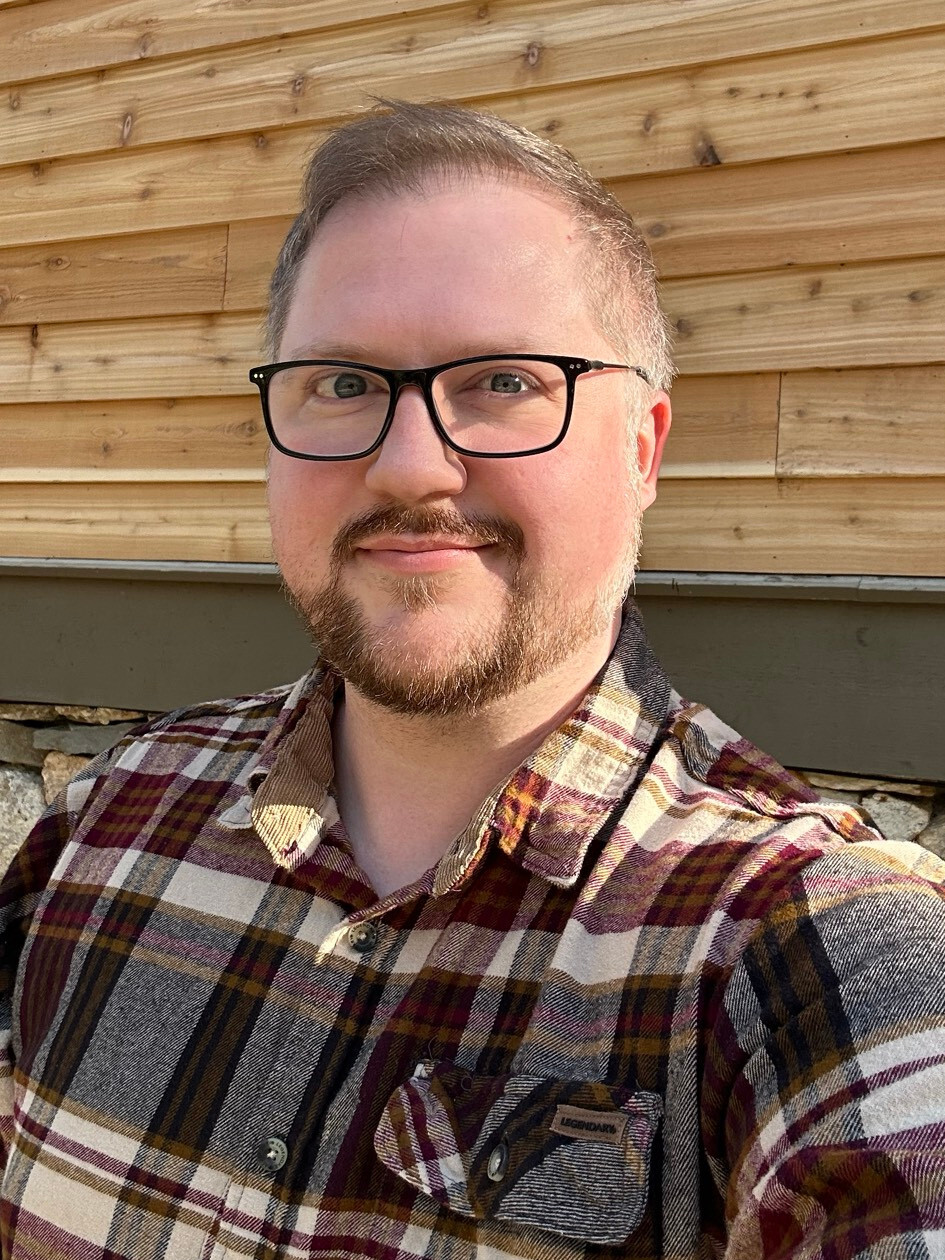
- Basinger in 2025
- Born: Clint Basinger; December 20, 1986 (age 39)
- Other name: Lazy Game Reviews

YouTube information
- Channel: @LGR
- Genre: Review
- Subscribers: 1.81 million
- Views: 607 million
- Last updated: June 13, 2026
- Website: www.lazygamereviews.com

Clint Basinger (born December 20, 1986), better known as LGR (originally an initialism of Lazy Game Reviews), is an American YouTuber who focuses on video game reviews, retrocomputing, and unboxing videos. His YouTube channel of the same name has been compared to Techmoan and The 8-Bit Guy. Basinger is known for building, restoring and reviewing many vintage computers and reviewing mainly PC games. The channel is funded through YouTube advertising, and through Patreon.

Basinger has stated that inspiration for starting LGR was at least partly inspired by the PBS television show Computer Chronicles.

== Content ==
His video series include LGR Thrifts, Tech Tales, and Oddware. In LGR Thrifts, Basinger visits thrift stores around his area (mainly Goodwill stores), where he purchases used games, computers or any other product that has his interest.

In July 2016, on the seven-year anniversary of the channel, Basinger built an i486-based computer he named the "Woodgrain 486", mainly to run early to mid 90s DOS games on it for review purposes. The computer had many modifications over the years.

In July 2018, Basinger rebuilt his Windows 98 computer with different parts, which he named it the "Lazy Green Giant" since he repainted its case to green. However, in January 2020, he decided to replace the original case with a Lian Li case, among other upgrades and modifications, he named it the "Megaluminum Monster".

For many years, one of the most popular and prominent series on LGR was reviews of games and downloadable content (DLC) from The Sims franchise, beginning with a "Quick Review" of The Sims 3 in 2009. In total, the LGR channel features over a hundred videos on the franchise, mostly involving reviews, but also "LGR Plays" let's play videos. In 2021, reviews for The Sims 4 DLC were no longer planned, except for major expansions.

Basinger had also made LGR Foods, a channel dedicated to him making various types of sandwiches, hamburgers and noodles, and LGR Birds, a wildlife livestream.

LGR's content creation was postponed in September 2024 after Basinger's North Carolina home was "incredibly damaged" as a result of Hurricane Helene. A further update posted in October 2024 indicated that while Hurricane Helene had damaged some of the vintage and retro computing collection used for the channel's content, an estimated "95%" had been recovered and stored in good condition.
