= Barry Altman =

American businessman

Barry S. Altman
- Born: 1948 or 1949; USA
- Died: December 8, 2012 (aged 63)
- Occupations: Entrepreneur, CEO
- Known for: Founded Commodore USA in 2010 and announced the Commodore 64x in partnership with Disney.

Barry S. Altman was the founder and CEO of Commodore USA from 2010 until his death in late 2012. Prior to founding Commodore USA, Barry worked for over 20 years in the satellite and communications industry. During his time at Commodore USA, the Commodore 64x was announced and put up for pre-sales. On December 8, 2012, Barry died from a prolonged battle with cancer.

== Early life ==
Barry Altman co-owned a telecommunications business called Cabletech in the 1970s and 1980s. Barry was first introduced to computers through Cabletech in the 1980s, using Commodore 64s due to their generally low price and simplicity. In 1991, Barry sold Cabletech, retired, and moved to Florida. In June 2004, Barry founded Homecraft, an importer and distributor of home furniture.

== Commodore USA ==
On March 26, 2010, Barry Altman founded Commodore USA. Commodore USA's first consumer product was a re-branded Cybernet Systems all-in-one keyboard PC. In 2011, Commodore USA began prototyping and injection molding an exact replica of the original Commodore 64, which was shortly thereafter noticed by the vice president of Disney, who wanted to set up a joint marketing venture between the Commodore 64x and TRON: Legacy. According to Barry in an interview, Commodore USA received an unexpected amount of publicity and pre-orders for the Commodore 64x after the release of such advertisements, resulting in their credit card terminal even overheating on several occasions.
