= Vintage computer =

Older computer system

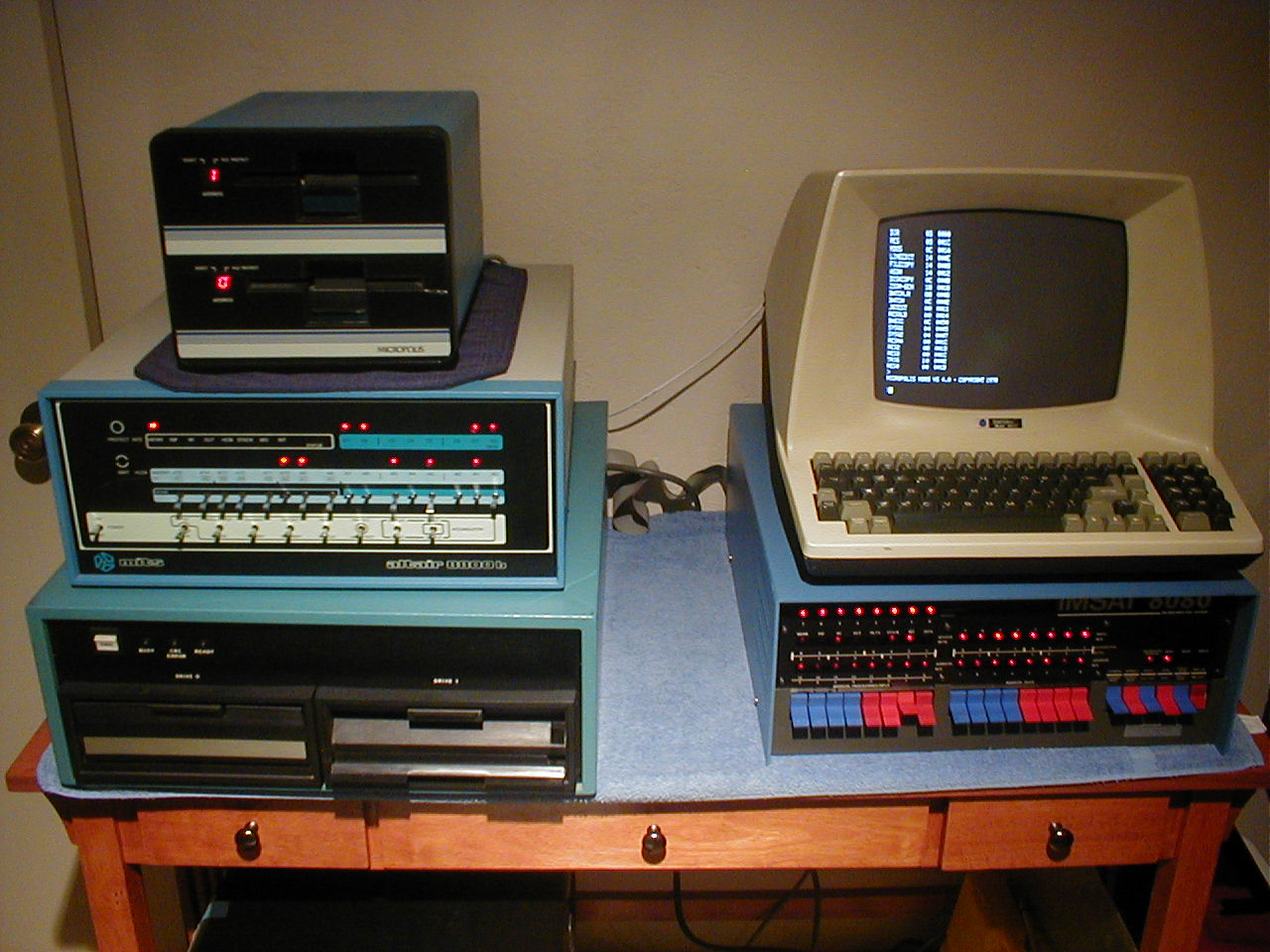
Altair and IMSAI computers with drives

A vintage computer is an older computer system that is largely regarded as obsolete.

The personal computer has been around since around 1971, and in that time technological advancement means existing models get replaced every few years. Nevertheless, these otherwise useless computers have spawned a sub-culture of vintage computer collectors who often spend large sums for the rarest examples, not only to display but functionally restore. This involves active software development and adaptation to modern uses. This often includes homebrew developers and hackers who add on, update and create hybrid composites from new and old computers for uses they were otherwise never intended.

Ethernet interfaces have been designed for many vintage 8-bit machines to allow limited connectivity to the Internet, where users can access discussion groups, bulletin boards, and software databases. Most of this hobby centers on computers made after 1960, though some collectors also specialize in older computers.

The Vintage Computer Festival, an event held by the Vintage Computer Federation for the exhibition and celebration of vintage computers, has been held annually since 1997 and has expanded internationally.

== By platform ==
=== MITS Inc. ===
Micro Instrumentation and Telemetry Systems (MITS) produced the Altair 8800 in 1975. According to Harry Garland, the Altair 8800 was the product that catalyzed the microcomputer revolution of the 1970s.

=== IMSAI ===
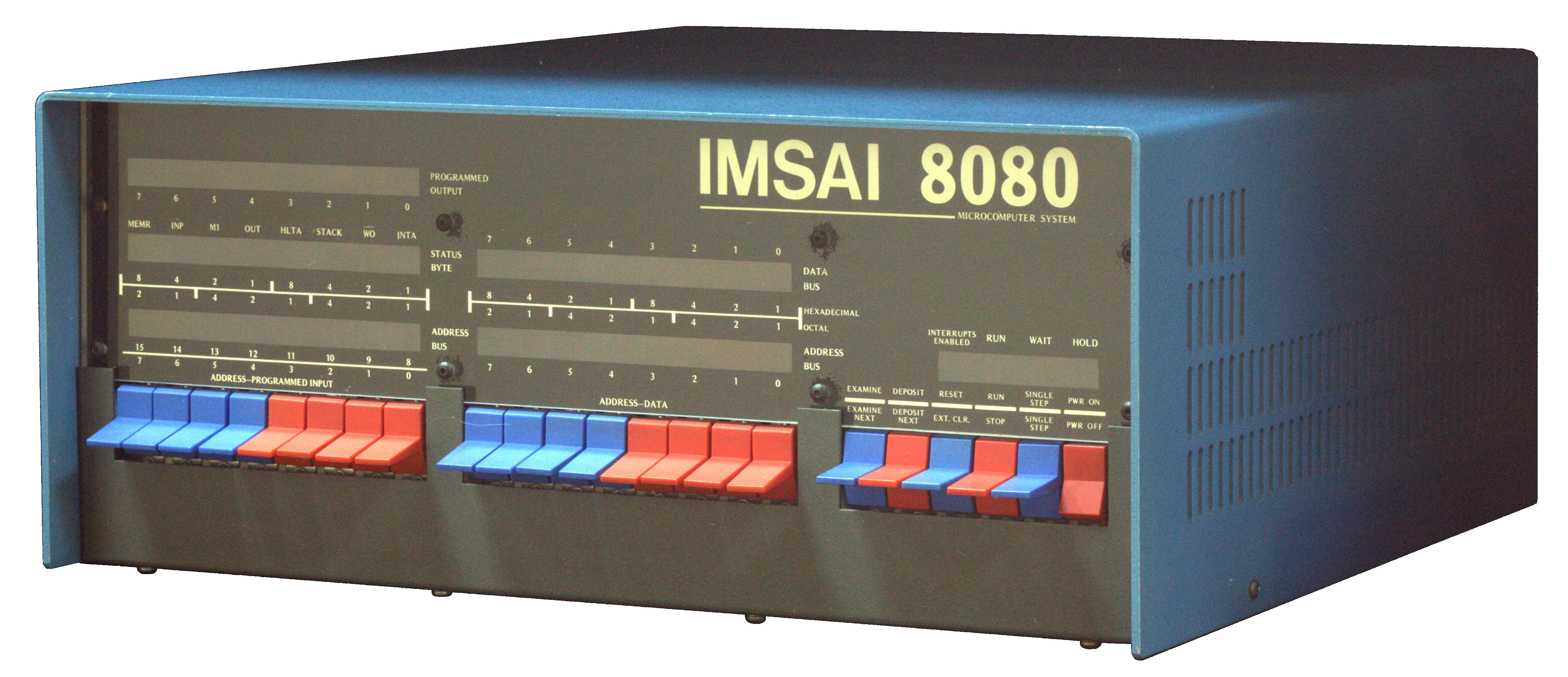
IMSAI 8080

The IMSAI 8080 is a clone of the Altair 8800. It was introduced in 1975, first as a kit, and later as an assembled system. The list price was $591 (equivalent to $3,584 in 2025) for a kit, and $931 (equivalent to $5,570 in 2025) assembled.

=== Processor Technology ===
Processor Technology produced the Sol-20. This was one of the first machines to have a case that included a keyboard; a design feature copied by many of the later "home computers".

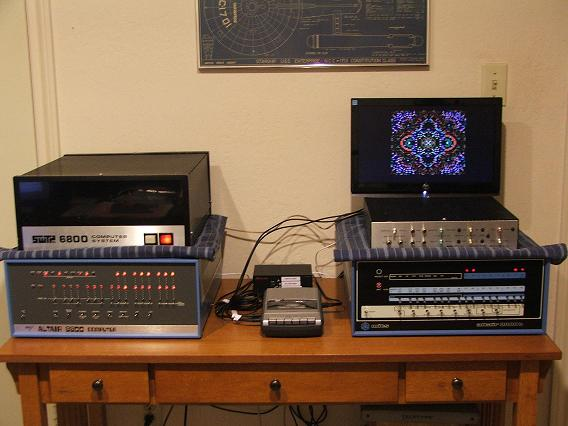
SWTPC and Altair computers from the 70s

=== SWTPC ===
Southwest Technical Products Corporation (SWTPC) produced the 8-bit SWTPC 6800 and later the 16-bit SWTPC 6809 kits that employed the Motorola 68xx series microprocessors.

=== Apple Inc. ===
The earliest Apple Inc. personal computers, using the MOS Technology 6502 processors, are among some of the most collectible. They are relatively easy to maintain in an operational state thanks to Apple's use of readily available off-the-shelf parts.

- Apple I (1976): The Apple-1 was Apple's first product and has brought some of the highest prices ever paid for a microcomputer at auction.
- Apple II (1977): The Apple II series of computers are some of the easiest to adapt, thanks to the original expansion architecture designed for them. New peripheral cards are still being designed by an avid thriving community, thanks to the longevity of this platform, manufactured from 1977 through 1993. Numerous websites exist to support not only legacy users but new adopters who weren't even born when the Apple II was discontinued by Apple.
- Macintosh (1984): The original Macintosh used a 32-bit Motorola 68000 processor running at 7.8336 MHz and came with 128 KB of RAM. The list price was $2495 (equivalent to $7,732 in 2025).
  Perhaps because of its friendly design and first commercially successful graphical user interface as well as its enduring Finder application that persists on the most current Macs, the Macintosh is one of the most collected and used vintage computers. With dozens of websites around the world, old Macintosh hardware and software are input into daily use. The Macintosh had a strong presence in many early computer labs, creating a nostalgia factor for former students who recall their first computing experiences.

=== RCA ===
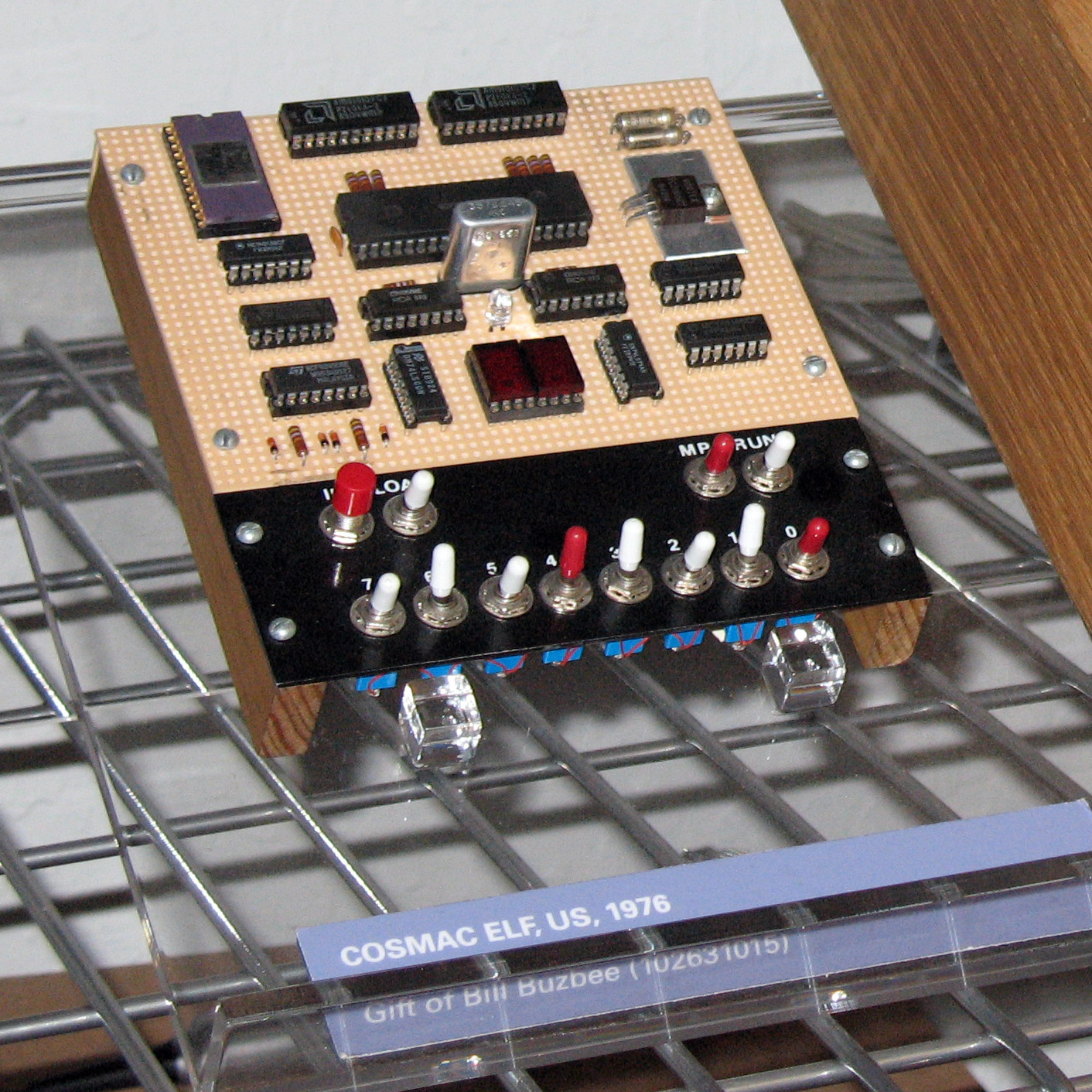
COSMAC Elf with Pixie Graphics Display

- The COSMAC Elf in 1976 was an inexpensive (about $100) single-board computer that was easily built by hobbyists. Many people who could not afford an Altair could afford an ELF, which was based on the RCA 1802 chip. Because the chips are still available from other sources, modern recreations of the ELF are fairly common and there are several fan websites.

=== IBM ===
- The IBM 1130 (1965) was a desk-sized small computer. It was the often the first computer used by many college students, still has a following of interested users. Most of the remaining 1130 systems in 2023 are in museums, but an emulator is available for users who don't have access to a physical 1130.
- The 5100 also has an avid collector and fan base.
- The PC series (5150 PC, 5155 Portable PC, 5160 PC/XT, 5170 PC/AT) has become very popular in recent years, with the earliest models (PC) being considered the most collectible.

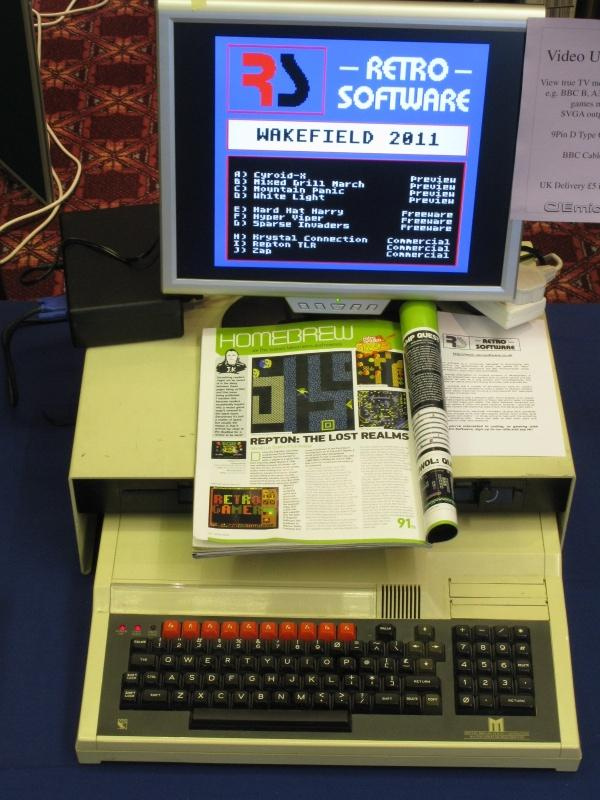
BBC Master with Retro Software games at the Wakefield RISC OS Show 2011

=== Acorn BBC & Archimedes ===
- The Acorn BBC Micro was a very popular British computer in the 1980s with home and educational users and enjoyed near-universal usage in British schools into the mid-1990s. It was possible to use 100K 5 1/4-inch disks, and it had many expansion ports.
- The Archimedes series – the de facto successor to the BBC Micro – has also enjoyed a following in recent years, thanks to its status as the first computer to be based around ARM's RISC microprocessor.

=== Tandy/Radio Shack ===
- Radio Shack, a division of the Tandy Corporation, released their first computer in 1977. This computer was the TRS-80 Model 1. The Model 1 has been considered part of the original trinity of home computers released that year along with the Apple II and the Commodore PET.
- The "80" in TRS-80 referred to the Z80 microprocessor used in the first few computers. Later that name was used for their Color Computer line, which used a 6809 microprocessor, thus breaking the meaning of the initial branding.
- The Tandy/RadioShack Model 100 is still widely collected and used as one of the earliest examples of a truly portable computer. Other Tandy offerings, such as the TRS-80 line, are also very popular, and early systems, like the Model I, in good condition can command premium prices on the vintage computer market.
- The Z80 systems (all branded TRS-80) were: Model 1, Model 2, Model 3, and Model 4. Later branding changed to use Tandy instead of Radio Shack. The Tandy branded lines included: Model 12, Model 16, and Model 6000.
- The 6809 systems (all branded TRS-80 with the exception of later Color Computers which used Tandy): Color Computer 1, Color Computer 2, and Color Computer 3.
- The 8085 systems (all branded TRS-80) were: Model 100, Model 102, Model 200, and Model 600.

=== Sinclair ===
- The Sinclair ZX81 and ZX Spectrum series were the most popular British home computers of the early 1980s, with a wide choice of emulators available for both platforms. The Spectrum in particular enjoys a cult following due to its popularity as a games platform, with new games titles still being developed even today. Original "rubber key" Spectrums fetch the highest prices on the second-hand market, with the later Amstrad-built models attracting less of a following. The earlier ZX81 is not as popular in original hardware form due to its monochrome display and limited abilities next to the Spectrum, but still unassembled ZX81 kits still appear on eBay occasionally.

=== MSX ===
- Although nearly nonexistent in the United States, the MSX architecture has strong communities of fans and hobbyists worldwide, particularly in Japan (where the standard was conceived and developed), South Korea (the only country that had an MSX-based game console, Zemmix), Netherlands, Spain, Brazil, Argentina, Russia, Chile, the Middle East, and others. New hardware and software are being actively developed to this day as well.
- One of the latest fundamental (from hardware and software perspectives) revivals of the MSX is the GR8BIT.

=== Robotron ===
- The Robotron Z1013 was an East German home computer produced by VEB Robotron. It had a U880 processor, 16 KB RAM, and a membrane keyboard.
- The KC 85 series of computers was a modular 8-bit computer system used in East German schools.

=== Commodore ===
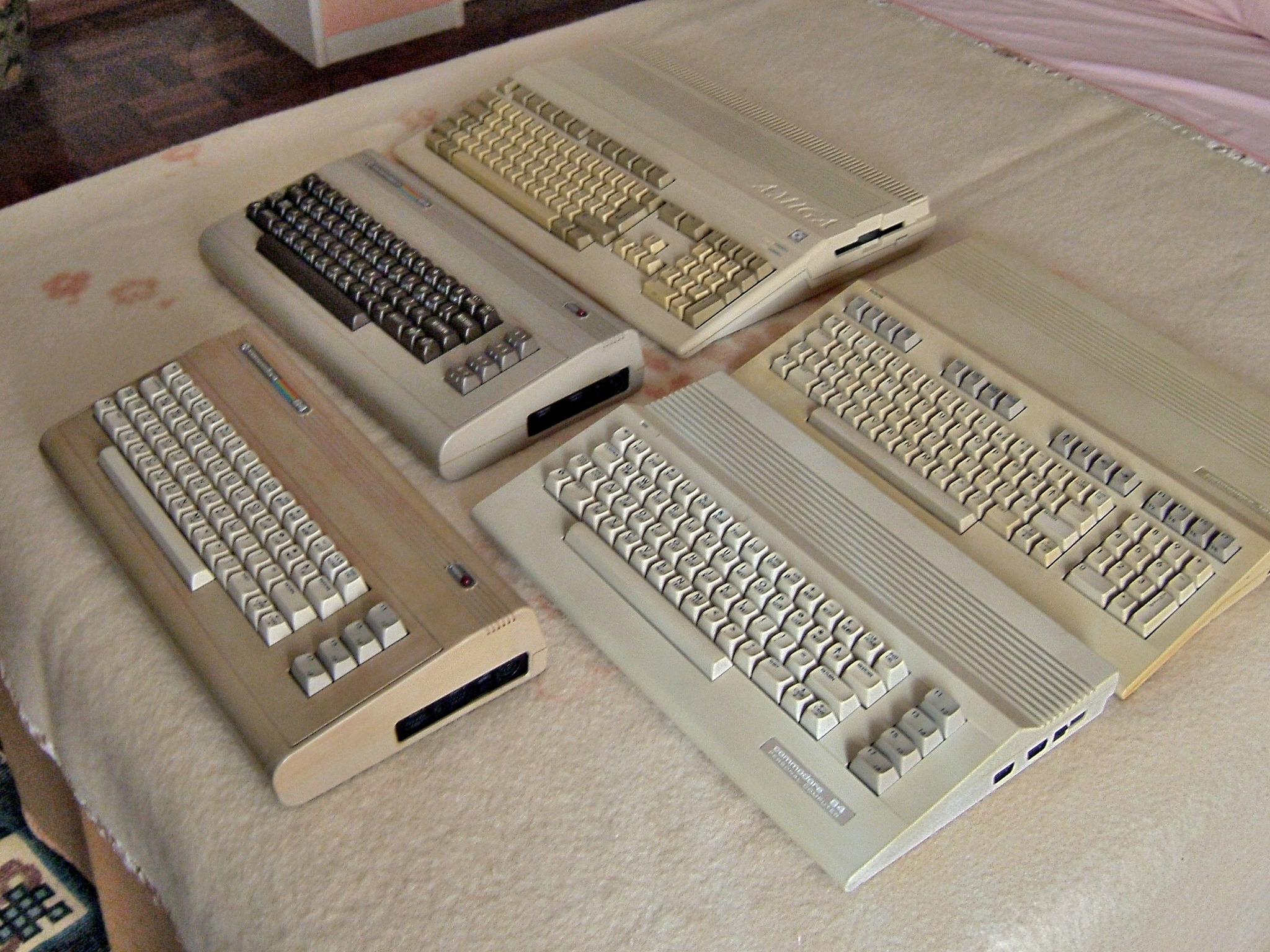
Computers from Commodore International: Amiga 500 (top left), Commodore 128 (top right), and three different variants of the Commodore 64

- VIC-20
- Commodore 64
- Commodore PET
- Amiga

=== Xerox ===
- The Xerox Alto, designed and manufactured by Xerox PARC and released in 1973, was the first personal computer equipped with a graphic user interface. In 1979, Steve Jobs of Apple Inc. arranged for his engineers to visit Xerox in order to see the Alto. The design concepts of the Alto soon appeared in the Apple Lisa and Macintosh systems.
- The Xerox Star, also known as the 8010/40, was made available in 1981. It followed on the Alto. Like the Alto, this machine was expensive and was only intended for corporate office usage. Therefore, being out of the price range of the average user, this product had little market penetration.

=== Silicon Graphics ===
- The SGI Indy, built in 1993 for Silicon Graphics has a history of usage in the development of the Nintendo 64 as well as various CGI projects throughout the 1990s and early 2000s. The Indy and other machines in the SGI lineup have remained cult classics.

== See also ==
- List of home computers by video hardware
- Living Computers: Museum + Labs
