= Commodore OS =

Commodore OS Vision
- Commodore OS Beta 9 Desktop
- Developer: Commodore USA (until 2013), Leo Nigro, Commodore International Corporation (starting June 2025)
- OS family: Linux (Unix-like)
- Working state: Current
- Source model: Open source
- Latest release: 3.1 / 28 April 2026
- Update method: APT
- Package manager: dpkg
- Supported platforms: x86-64
- Kernel type: Monolithic (Linux)
- Userland: GNU
- Default user interface: MATE
- License: GNU General Public License, others
- Official website: Commodore OS Vision

Commodore OS (full name: Commodore OS Vision) is a community driven free-to-download Linux distribution for Commodore enthusiasts purchasing Commodore licensed computer equipment. First developed by Commodore USA, it was intended for use on their range of PCs, particularly the Commodore 64x and Vic Slim computers. The first public beta version was released on 11 November 2011. It was based on Linux Mint, and used the GNOME 2 desktop environment. The company became defunct in 2013 before version 1.0 of the OS could officially come out of beta.

In 2021, Commodore USA's spiritual successor, My Retro Computer Ltd., announced a Kickstarter campaign to bring back the Commodore 64x. The following year, it was announced by Leo Nigro, former CTO of Commodore USA and who is originally responsible for the OS, that a new release would be made for the return of the Commodore 64x. Version 2.0 officially came out of beta and was released on 13 December 2023. Available to download via a Torrent file on the Commodore OS official website, it is based on Debian and is an unofficial MX Linux spin using the Compiz window manager.

There is also an online forum, dedicated to the OS itself and to the new C64x, where people can read the latest news/updates, request help with issues they are encountering, and discuss many things Commodore.

== History ==
=== Version 1.0 ===
The first beta of the OS was released on 12 November 2011 by Commodore USA, announced as an operating system for "pre-installation on all future Commodore USA hardware". Version 1.0 never officially came out of the beta phase as Commodore USA went defunct in 2013. The company's website hosting the OS shutdown, and its last release was beta 9 on 9 July 2012.

==== Unofficial support (2013-2016) ====
However, it continued to have small community support - with an unofficial 32 bit version of the operating system released on 22 February 2012. The software and drivers have continued to be available through a page set up by ex-Commodore USA employees who run the still active Commodore USA Facebook page. However, the last active posts date back to 2016. So unofficial support ended in 2016. More than 3 years after the official one, on a 1.0 release that never officially came out.

=== Version 2.0 ===
Following the demise of Commodore USA, My Retro Computer Ltd. purchased the company's domain name and C64x molds/stock. On 21 December 2021, it was announced on My Retro Computer's YouTube channel that a Kickstarter campaign was going to launch to bring back the Commodore 64x in all new colors and case designs.

In May 2022 Leo Nigro, former CTO of Commodore USA, who was responsible for the OS announced he would make a new release in time for the return of the Commodore 64x. Version 2.0 officially came out of beta and was released on 13 December 2023. In 2024 was available to download via a Torrent file on the Commodore OS official website.

=== Version 3.0 ===
In Version 3.0 of Commodore OS, a modern BASIC implementation is included as Commodore OS BASIC V1 with modern 3D graphics, built in sprites, tile maps and 2D and 3D physics and user types. In the Version 3.0 release, it includes a new settings manager for configuring ROMs and emulation, and basic theming options for the system such as animated backgrounds. As of June 2025, with the founding of the new Commodore International Corporation, Commodore OS is officially managed, updated, and maintained as always by Leo Nigro, who is a co-founder and part of the Commodore International Corporation team. Commodore OS is now an asset of Commodore International Corporation. In 2026, the Commodore 64X PC with OS Vision 3.0 was sold with new hardware components from an official partner of Commodore International Corporation; it was possible to choose between a basic version and a more powerful version, or to assemble one yourself. Commodore OS Vision 3.1 was released in April of 2026.

== Compatibility ==
Commodore OS is not compatible with Commodore 64 software. However, it does contain VICE, an open-source program which emulates Commodore systems.

== Design ==
Commodore OS was designed as a way to imitate the look and feel of Commodore's legacy systems, and as a complement to the all-in-one-keyboard style of the personal computer. Commodore OS includes a collection of software intended to imitate classic Commodore software.

== Product life cycle ==
| Commodore OS version | Last minor release | Release date | End of Full Support | End of Maintenance |
|---|---|---|---|---|
| 1 | 1.0-beta1 | 12 November 2011 | 2012 | 2012 |
| 1 | 1.0-beta9 | 1 July 2012 | 2013 | 2013 |
| 2 | 2.0 | 13 December 2023 | | |
| 3 | 3.0 | 22 April 2025 | | |
| 3 | 3.1 | 28 April 2026 | | |
| 4 | | 2027 | | |
Legend: Unsupported Supported Latest version Preview version Future version
