= MEPIS =

SimplyMEPIS

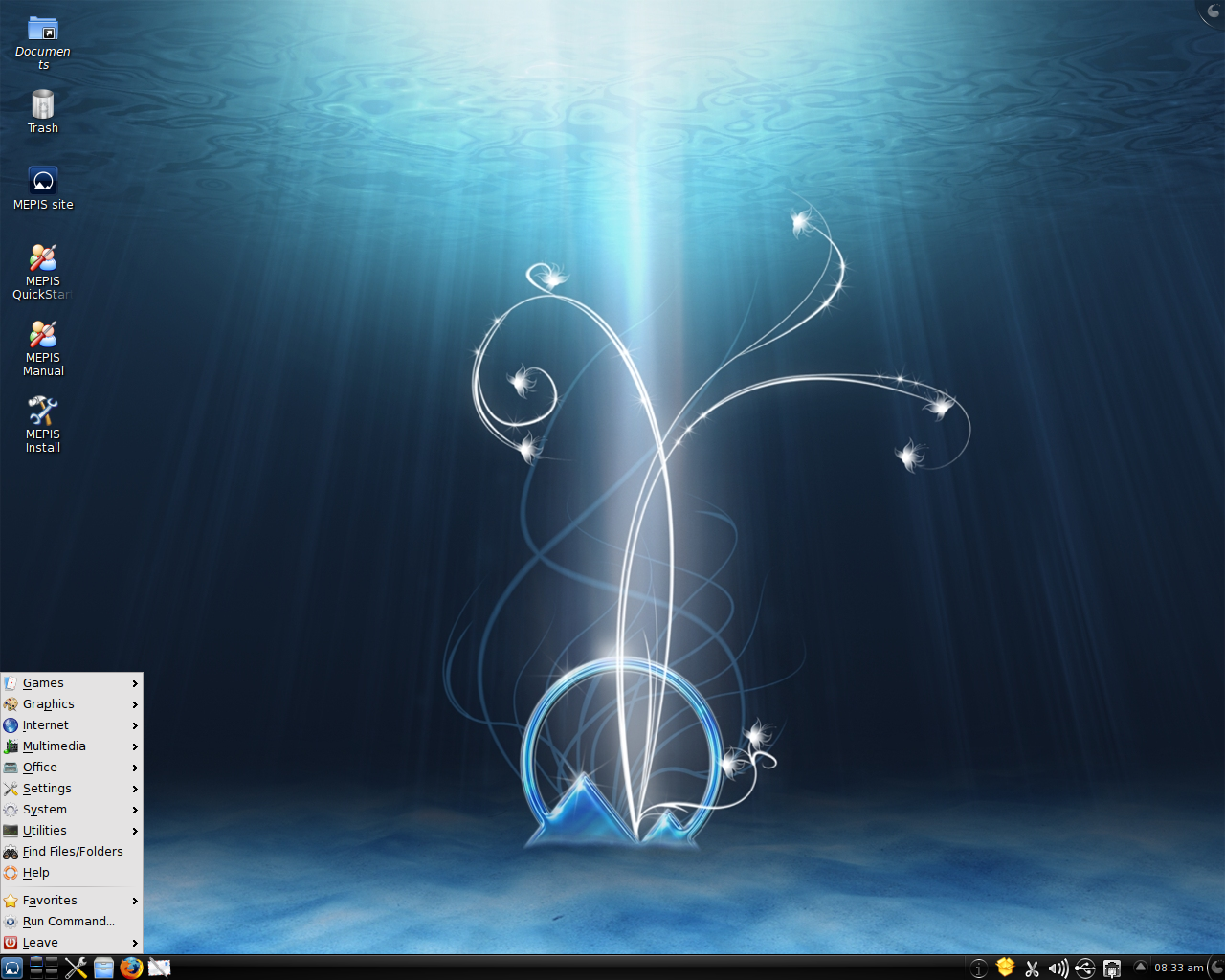
- SimplyMEPIS 11.0 default desktop
- Developer: Warren Woodford
- OS family: Linux (Unix-like)
- Working state: Inactive
- Initial release: May 2003
- Latest release: 11.9.92 (12.0 Beta 2) / 10 August 2013; 12 years ago
- Update method: APT
- Package manager: dpkg
- Supported platforms: IA-32, x86-64
- Kernel type: Monolithic
- Default user interface: KDE Plasma Desktop
- License: Various

MEPIS /ˈmɛpɪs/ was a set of Linux distributions, distributed as Live CDs or DVDs that could be installed onto a hard disk drive. MEPIS was started by Warren Woodford and MEPIS LLC.

The most popular MEPIS distribution was SimplyMEPIS, which was based primarily on Debian stable, with the last version of SimplyMEPIS being based on Debian 6. It could either be installed onto a hard drive or used as a Live DVD, which made it externally bootable for troubleshooting and repairing many operating systems. It included the KDE desktop environment.

== History ==
MEPIS was designed as an alternative to SUSE Linux, Red Hat Linux, and Mandriva Linux (formerly Mandrake) which Woodford considered too difficult for the average user. MEPIS's first official release was on May 10, 2003.

In 2006, MEPIS made a transition from using Debian packages to using Ubuntu packages. SimplyMEPIS 6.0, released in July 2006, was the first version of MEPIS to incorporate the Ubuntu packages and repositories.

SimplyMEPIS 7.0 discontinued the use of Ubuntu binary packages in favor of a combination of MEPIS packaged binaries based on Debian and Ubuntu source code, combined with a Debian stable OS core and extra packages from Debian package pools.

Major releases occurred about six months to one year apart until 2013, based mostly on Warren's availability to produce the next version.

== Variants ==
SimplyMEPIS, designed for everyday desktop and laptop computing. The default desktop environment is KDE-based, although Gnome and/or other GUI-environments can be installed. SimplyMEPIS 11.0 is based on Debian 6 and includes Linux 2.6.36.4, KDE 4.5.1 and LibreOffice 3.3.2, with other applications available from Debian and the MEPIS Community. It was released on May 5, 2011. Development halted during beta testing of Mepis 12.

antiX, a fast and lightweight distribution, was originally based on MEPIS for x86 systems in an environment suitable for old computers. It's now based on Debian Stable.

MX Linux, a midweight distribution developed in collaboration between antiX and former MEPIS communities which is based on Debian Stable.

== Name ==
According to Warren Woodford, the name MEPIS is pronounced like "Memphis", with the extra letters removed. Originally, the word "MEPIS" didn't mean anything in particular; it came about by mistake. When Woodford misunderstood a friend over the telephone, he decided to use the name because it was a simple five-letter word and there were no other companies or products with that name.
