= Fluxbox =

Open source window manager for the X11 system

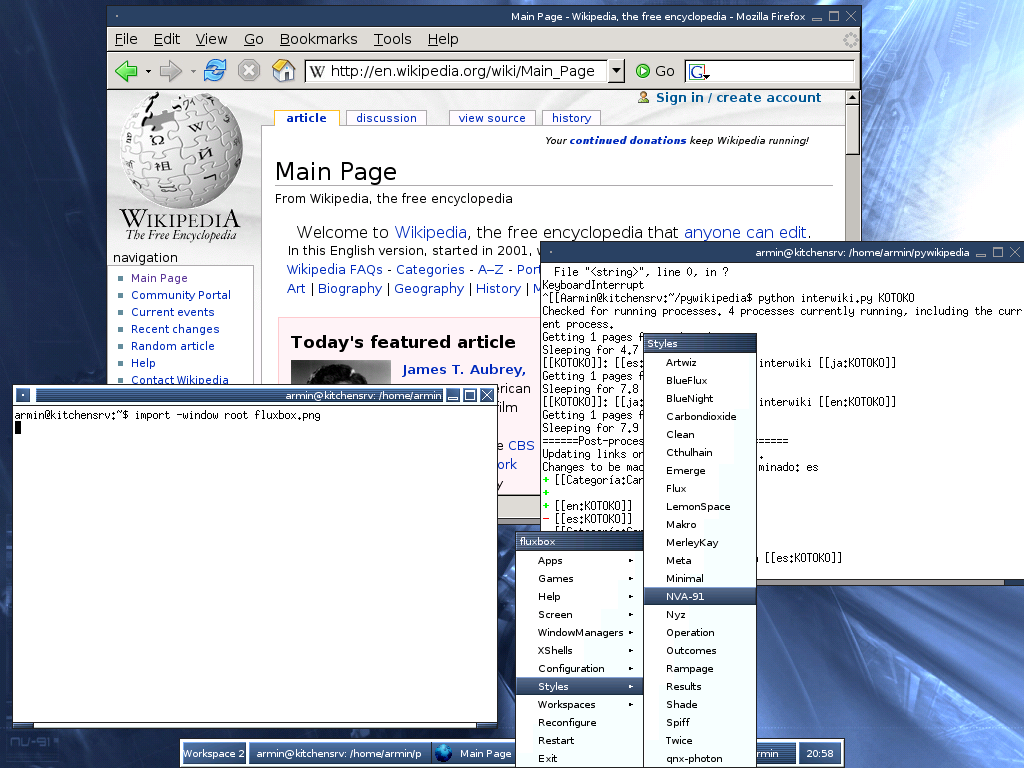
- Fluxbox with a customized theme
- Developer: Henrik Kinnunen
- Stable release: 1.3.7 / 8 February 2015; 11 years ago
- Written in: C++
- Operating system: Unix/Unix-like (Note: Including: BSD derivatives, such as DragonFly BSD, FreeBSD, NetBSD and OpenBSD; Linux; MINIX; Solaris)
- Type: Stacking window manager
- License: MIT
- Website: fluxbox.org
- Repository: https://github.com/fluxbox/fluxbox

Fluxbox 1.3 Xsession running on Debian GNU/Linux 7

Fluxbox is a stacking window manager for the X Window System, which started as a fork of Blackbox 0.61.1 in 2001, with the same aim to be lightweight. Its user interface has only a taskbar, a pop-up menu accessible by right-clicking on the desktop, and minimal support for graphical icons. All basic configurations are controlled by text files, including the construction of menus and the mapping of key-bindings. Fluxbox has high compliance to the Extended Window Manager Hints specification.

Fluxbox is basic in appearance, but it can show a few options for improved attractiveness: colors, gradients, borders, and several other basic appearance attributes can be specified. Recent versions support rounded corners and graphical elements. Effects managers such as xcompmgr, cairo-compmgr and transset-df (deprecated) can add true transparency to desktop elements and windows. Enhancements can also be provided by using iDesk or fbdesk, SpaceFM, PCMan File Manager or the ROX Desktop. Fluxbox also has several features Blackbox lacks, including tabbed windows and a configurable titlebar.

Because of its small memory footprint and quick loading time, Fluxbox is popular in many Live CDs such as GParted. It was the default window manager of Damn Small Linux and antiX, but was replaced with JWM in 2007 and 2009, respectively. It is currently the default window manager of PCFluxboxOS, a remaster of PCLinuxOS, and of Linux Mint Fluxbox CE. Fluxbuntu, an Ubuntu derivative with lightweight applications, was released in October 2007.

On December 12, 2019, MX Linux released MX-Fluxbox as a fully integrated overlay of MX Linux 19. Previously it had been available from 2014 onward through the Package Installer. A Fluxbox edition has been added to the MX-21 series with Fluxbox in use by default. Fluxbox is also a featured window manager on antiX.

The early versions of Lumina, a desktop environment created for TrueOS, were based on Fluxbox.

As of August 2025 there are 23 flavors of Linux/Unix offering the Fluxbox Window Manager.

== Features ==
- Right-clicking on the desktop gives a root menu
- Customizable root menu
- Wallpapers
- Running applications appear in a taskbar
- Support for desktop themes
- Customizable keyboard shortcuts
- Window tabbing
- Slit for applications such as system monitors

== Customization ==
Customization is done by editing configuration files in the .fluxbox subdirectory in the user's home directory:

- Keyboard shortcuts are stored in the ~/.fluxbox/keys file.
- Menu layout is in the ~/.fluxbox/menu file.
- Everything that is run at startup is kept in the ~/.fluxbox/startup file.
- The fluxbox configuration file is held at ~/.fluxbox/init.

== Fluxbox in distributed ISOs ==
Linux distros where Fluxbox is the sole window manager: GParted Live, Grml, MX Linux, Live Raizo and Slax Linux. Fluxbox is installed with another or several Window Managers: CROWZ, Damn Small Linux, Exherbo, PLD Linux Distribution, and Plop Linux.

== See also ==
- Openbox
- Comparison of X window managers
