= AntiX =

Lightweight systemd free Linux distribution

antiX
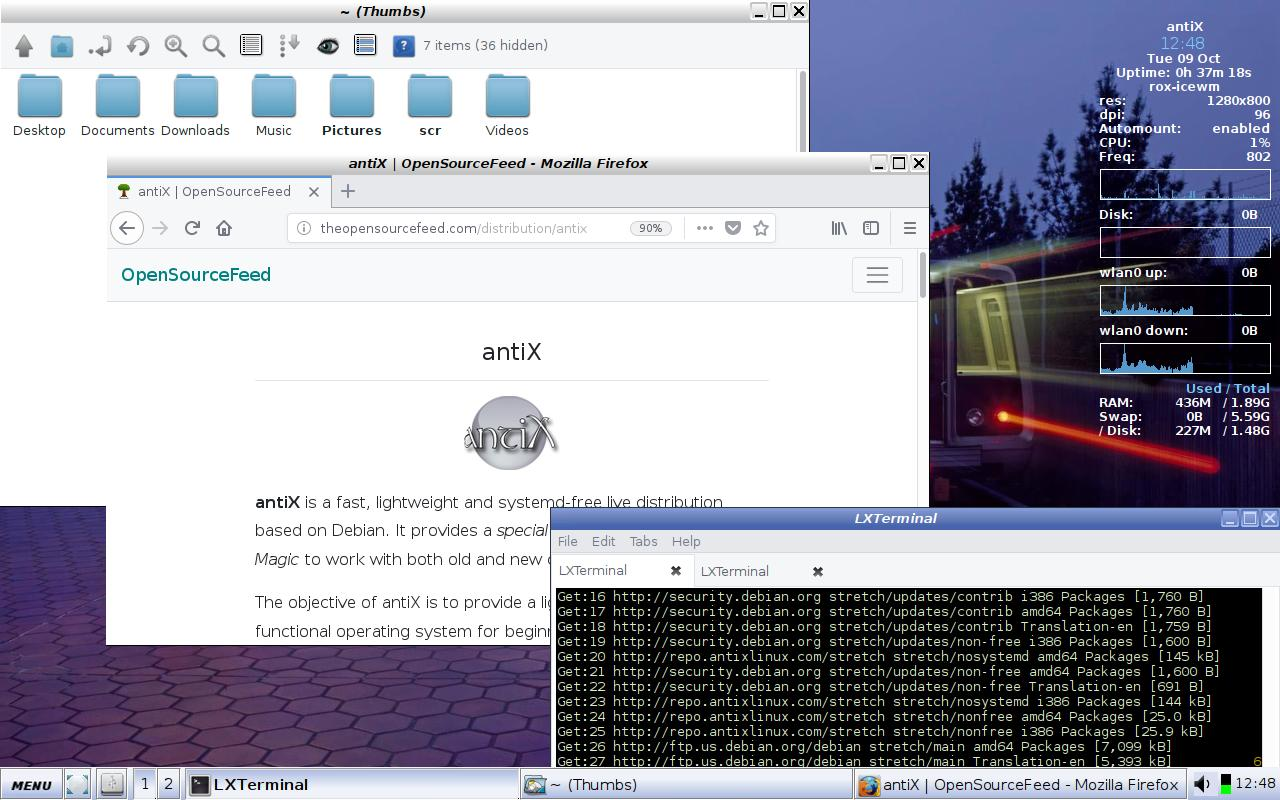
- OS family: Unix-like (Linux kernel)
- Working state: Current
- Source model: Open source
- Latest release: antiX 26.1 "Stephen Kapos" / September 29, 2026; 8 days ago
- Marketing target: older PCs
- Update method: Long-term support LTS
- Package manager: APT
- Supported platforms: IA-32, x64
- Kernel type: Monolithic (Linux kernel)
- Userland: GNU
- Default user interface: Rox-IceWM, Fluxbox, IceWM, JWM, herbstluftwm
- License: GPL version 2
- Official website: antixlinux.com
- Tagline: systemd and elogind free

antiX (/ˈæntɪks/) is a Linux distribution, originally based on MEPIS, which itself is based on the Debian Stable distribution. antiX initially replaced the MEPIS KDE desktop environment with the Fluxbox and IceWM window managers, making it suitable for older, less powerful x86-based systems. Unlike Debian, antiX does not use the systemd init system; instead, it provides an ISO image in which Runit is set as the default init system. The declared goal of the developers is to significantly extend the useful life of existing old & new computers by specifically selecting efficient software and operating system components.

antiX reflects technical influences from distributions such as sidux, TinyMe, Puppy, Absolute, and SliTaz. These influences are incorporated into current versions of the operating system.

== Distribution motto ==
The motto of the antiX distribution is "proudly anti-fascist". The distro's creator is Paul "anticapitalista" Banham from Thessaloniki, Greece, who describes himself as a type of Marxist.

== Features ==
AntiX 23.1 using IceWM

The distribution is lightweight and designed for older PCs, including a 'Legacy' 5.10 kernel for older computers and a 'Modern' 6.1 kernel which provides better hardware support for more recent PCs. It has a large app selection from both Debian and antiX repositories, and does not use the controversial systemd or elogind.

- Starting with version 19, antiX offers sysVinit and runit as a choice for the init system.
- Starting with version 22, antiX is offered elogind-free for both 32-bit and 64-bit architecture.
- Starting with version 23.1, antiX has new apps: antiX TV, antiX Radio, Finder, antiX SAMBA manager, and several others.
- Starting with version 23.2, antiX Full comes with two kernels: Legacy 5.10 and Modern 6.1.

antiX has extensive support for "live CD" and "live USB" modes, booting quickly and running independently of the system's disk.

== Window managers ==
antiX comes with a default desktop built on top of the ROX or Zzzfm file managers, with the GTK library and using IceWM as the window manager. antiX-full and antiX-base include these stacking window managers:

- Lightweight: Rox-IceWM (default), IceWM and ZzzFM-IceWM
- Minimalist: Rox-Fluxbox, Fluxbox and ZzzFM-Fluxbox
- Very minimalist: Rox-JWM, JWM and ZzzFM-JWM

Running the ROX or Zzzfm variants provides desktop icons and a drag-and-drop function. Conky provides system monitor availability.

== Flavors ==
antiX, starting with release 26 is a multi-init system that is provided with 5 init systems. Runit (the default) and SysVinit, which had previously been provided in separate ISO files are now supplemented by dinit, S6-RC, and S6-66.

They are merged into a single ISO where, at startup, the desired init system can be selected. The antiX Control Center offers the possibility to define one of these init systems is set as the standard, which antiX automatically boots from thereafter.

antiX 26 is available for IA-32 (32-bit) and x86-64 (64-bit) architectures, and comes in two flavours:

- Full, Includes X, four window managers, LibreOffice suite, and a 'Package Installer' which allows installation of a full range of applications (2.0 Gb)
- Core, no gui environment, but should support most wireless, command-line installer without encryption, enables the user to have total control over the install (660 Mb).

antiX23 was offered with two additional flavours:

- Base, Includes X, four window managers and a 'Package Installer' which allows the user to choose their own application suite (1 GB). Available in antiX 23 and older.
- net, No gui environment, command-line installer without encryption, enables the user to have total control, no desktop environment by default (220 MB). Available in antiX 23 and older.

antiX versions were joined by MEPIS in 2014, developed in cooperation with the MEPIS community to form MX Linux. MX Linux uses Xfce as the default desktop environment, is based directly on Debian Stable, and gives solid performance from a medium-sized footprint. Since November 2016, MX Linux is listed as a separate distro on DistroWatch.

== Releases ==
System requirements
Requirement	Minimum	Recommended
Shared specs
CPU	IA-32 ("i386")	x64
Memory	512 Mb	1 Gb
antiX Full
Free space	10 Gb	
antiX Base
Free space	5 Gb	
antiX Core
Free space	2 Gb	
antiX Net
Free space	1 Gb	
Network	Ethernet	

The releases of antiX are named after prominent left-wing figures, groups and revolutionaries.

Historical versions

Version	Code Name	Date
6.5	Spartacus	9 July 2007
7.0	Lysistrata	30 October 2007
7.2	Vetëvendosje	16 May 2008
7.5	Toussaint Louverture	24 August 2008
8.0	Intifada!	14 February 2009
8.2	Tȟašúŋke Witkó	24 July 2009
8.5	Marek Edelman	12 April 2010
M11	Jayaben Desai	3 May 2011
12	Edelweißpiraten	7 August 2012
13	Luddite	2 July 2013
MX-14.4	Symbiosis	23 March 2015
15	Killah P	30 June 2015
MX-15	Fusion	24 December 2015
16	Berta Cáceres	26 June 2016
17	Heather Heyer	24 October 2017
17.1	Heather Heyer	18 March 2018
17.2	Helen Keller	5 October 2018
17.4.1	Helen Keller	28 March 2019
17.5	Helen Keller	9 January 2022
19	Marielle Franco	17 October 2019
19.1	Marielle Franco	23 December 2019
19.2	Hannie Schaft	28 March 2020
19.3	Manolis Glezos	16 October 2020
19.4	Grup Yorum	21 May 2021
19.5	Grup Yorum	25 January 2022
Legend: Unsupported Supported Latest version

Supported versions

Version	Code Name	Date
21	Grup Yorum	31 October 2021
22	Grup Yorum	19 October 2022
23	Arditi del Popolo	28 August 2023
23.1	Arditi del Popolo	22 February 2024
23.2	Arditi del Popolo	6 October 2024
26	Stephen Kapos	March 21, 2026
26.1	Stephen Kapos	September 29, 2026
Legend: Unsupported Supported Latest version Preview version

== See also ==
- Category:Linux distributions without systemd
- List of Linux distributions that run from RAM
- Light-weight Linux distribution
- MX Linux a distro based on Debian using core antiX components.
