= MX Linux =

Mid-weight family of operating systems

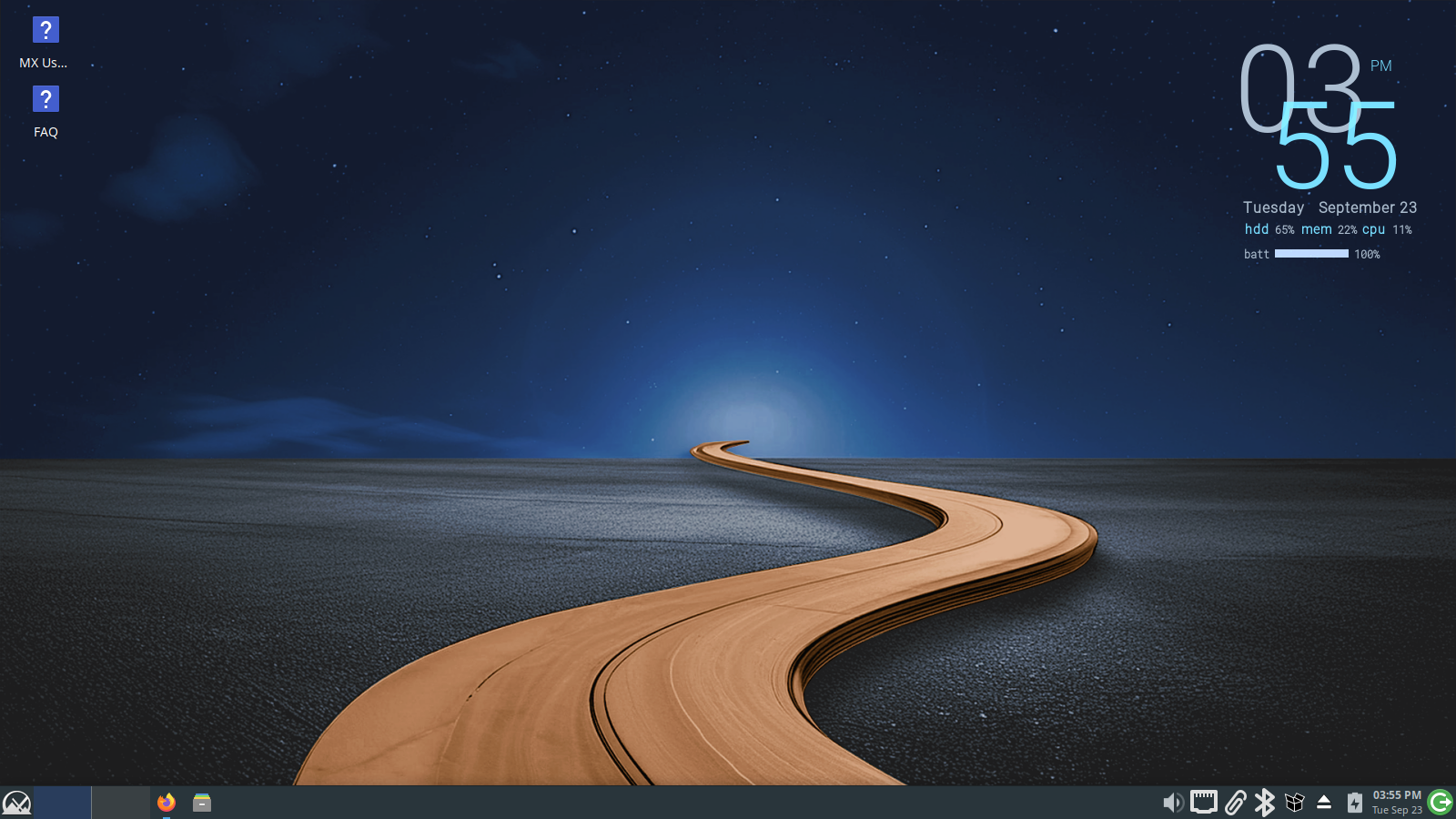
- MX Linux 25 "Infinity" desktop.
- Developer: MX Dev Team
- OS family: Unix-like (Linux kernel)
- Working state: Current
- Source model: Open source
- Initial release: 24 March 2014; 12 years ago
- Latest release: 25.3 / 20 September 2026; 49 days ago
- Repository: github.com/MX-Linux
- Marketing target: Personal computers
- Available in: Over 63 languages
- Update method: Long-term support LTS
- Package manager: Apt (dpkg) · Flatpak
- Supported platforms: x86-64
- Kernel type: Monolithic (Linux)
- Userland: GNU
- Default user interface: Xfce, Fluxbox & KDE
- License: Free licenses compliant with DFSG
- Official website: mxlinux.org

MX Linux is a midweight, desktop-oriented Linux distribution based on Debian Stable 13 "trixie" that emphasizes stability, performance, and ease of use. MX Linux uses core antiX components, with additional software created or packaged by the MX community. The development of MX Linux is a collaborative effort between the antiX and former MEPIS communities. The MX name comes from the "M" in MEPIS and the "X" in antiX — an acknowledgment of their roots.

The MX Linux community's stated goal is to produce "a family of operating systems that are designed to combine elegant and efficient desktops with high stability and solid performance". They maintain an active community with comprehensive documentation, support forum, and video tutorials to support diverse user needs.

== History ==
MX Linux began in a discussion about future options among members of the MEPIS community in December 2013. Developers from antiX then joined them, bringing the ISO build system as well as Live-USB/DVD technology. To be listed on the Linux distribution clearinghouse Web site DistroWatch, MX Linux was initially presented as a version of antiX called MX "Fusion". It received its own DistroWatch page with the release of the first public beta of MX Linux 16 "Metamorphosis" on 2 November 2016.

=== Distribution ===
MX Linux offers ISO images for installation that can be downloaded directly or by using BitTorrent. Physical discs can also be bought from retailers. Fluxbox, KDE and Xfce are available in 64-bit variants of those releases.

The MX Devs create Snapshots for ease of installation after a release. These begin a few months after a release. Snapshots include all upgrades & subsequent bug fixes. This greatly reduces the time spent and updating bandwidth usage during an installation.

== Releases ==
Older releases
*The MX-14, codename "Symbiosis", series was based on Debian Stable "Wheezy", using Xfce 4.10 and then, with the 14.4 release, Xfce 4.12. The MX-14 versions were intended to fit onto a CD-ROM, which limited the number of applications that could be included. This series saw the gradual evolution of the MX Tools, a collection of utilities to help users with common tasks that are often complicated and obscure.
*MX-15 "Fusion" moved to the new Debian Stable "Jessie" using systemd-shim, meaning that systemd is installed, but the default init is sysvinit. The size limitation was lifted, enabling the developers to present a full turnkey product. There was a substantial expansion of MX Tools.
*MX-16 "Metamorphosis" was still based on Debian Stable "Jessie", but with many applications backported and added from other sources. There were further refinements to MX Tools, the import of advanced antiX developments, expanded support, and a completely new icon/theme/wallpaper collection.
*MX-16.1 collected all bug fixes and improvements since MX-16, added a new kingfisher theme, upgraded and streamlined MX Tools, revised documentation, and added new translations.
*MX-17 "Horizon" changed its base to Debian 9 (Stretch) and brought upgraded artwork, new MX Tools, improved Live operation via antiX and other changes.
*MX-18 "Continuum" continued the development of MX Tools, introduced a new kernel, enabled whole disk encryption, and added GRUB themes, splash functionality through MX Boot options artwork, and improved localization.
*MX-19 "Patito feo" upgraded its base to Debian 10 (Buster) and its default desktop to Xfce 4.14. It is characterized by new and revised Tools, artwork, documentation, localization, and technical features.
*MX-21 "Wildflower" was released on 21 October 2021. It is based on Debian 11.0 (Bullseye) and is available as Xfce, KDE or Fluxbox versions. Disk Manager returns and for share settings, MX Samba Config app (GUI) is included. MX-21.1 was released on 9 April 2022. MX-21.2 was released on 28 August 2022. MX-21.2.1 was released on 18 September 2022. MX-21.3 3rd refresh of MX-21, was released on 14 January 2023.

- MX-23 "Libretto" was released on 31 July 2023. Based on Debian 12 with bug fixes, new kernels, and many application updates. Available as Xfce (4.18), Xfce AHS, KDE, and Fluxbox versions. Further details are in the MX blog. MX-23.1 "Libretto" was released on 15 October 2023. First ISO refresh of the initial MX-23 release.
- MX-23.2 "Libretto" was released on 21 January 2024. 2nd ISO refresh of MX-23, consisting of Debian 12.4, bug fixes, newer kernels, updated firmware & mesa libraries, Pipewire 1.0, and two new tools: MX Locale and Papirus Folder Colors. MX-23.3 "Libretto" was released on 19 May 2024. 3rd ISO refresh of MX-23 MX-23.4 "Libretto" was released on 15 September 2024. 4th ISO refresh of MX-23
- MX-23.5 "Libretto" was released on 13 January 2025. 5th ISO refresh of MX-23, consisting of an update to Debian 12.9, kernel updates, MX Package Installer has UI improvements and better version display for packages, updated Xfce 4.20 core packages, bug fixes, language updates, and many new applications in the MX 'test' repository.
- MX-23.6 "Libretto" was released on 13 April 2025. 6th ISO refresh of MX-23, consisting of: update to Debian 12.10, kernel updates, bug fixes, and language updates. UEFI Manager, a new app for managing UEFI settings. Many new applications in the MX 'test' repository.
- MX-25 "Infinity" was released on 9 November 2025 and was built on Debian 13 "trixie". Standard kernel is 6.12.43 with Liquorix 6.15 for the Advanced Hardware Support "AHS". New is the deb822 sources format. The installer can "replace" an existing install and offers zram swap. Support for Secure Boot. KDE is version 6.3.6 with both Wayland and X11 sessions available. All releases are available with Systemd. The Xfce, Xfce-AHS, and Fluxbox releases are also available in sysVint variants.
- MX-25.1 With the release of 25.1, Dual Init is now again possible. This includes both systemd and SysVinit init systems on the same ISO.
- MX-25.2 was released on May 24, 2026. AHS includes Mesa 26.0.1. All have Debian updates through 13.5, updates from the MX Linux repositories, and patches for all the latest "meme bugs" in the Linux kernel.
- MX-25.3 was released on September 20, 2026. All releases feature updated 6.12.107 Debian kernels. AHS includes Mesa 26.1.4 with the 7.2.6 Liquorix kernel. All have Debian updates through 13.7, updates from the MX Linux repositories, and MX-Welcome, MX-Tools and custom-toolbox received user interface facelifts.ISO Signature Verifier, a new MX Tool for verifying digital signatures for not only MX isos, but also isos from many popular distros.

== Desktop editions ==
MX Linux uses Xfce as the main desktop environment, to which it adds a freestanding KDE Plasma version and, in 2021, a stand-alone Fluxbox implementation. All editions contain a "move in ready" set of applications beyond what Debian includes with each desktop and many feature enhancements such as disk and driver tools. LibreOffice 26.x Word Processing suite, and VLC multimedia software comes pre-installed. Other environments can be added or are available as "spin-off" ISO images.

The four MX Linux editions:

- Xfce is a fast and medium-low resource usage desktop environment of Xfce version 4.20 offered as 64-bit ISOs.
- Fluxbox is a window manager with very low resource usage. Fluxbox 64-bit version is 1.3.7.
- KDE a 64-bit Advanced Hardware Support (AHS) version. It currently features version 6.3.6 of the KDE Plasma desktop and Linux kernel 6.12 (or later). Wayland is the default session, but X11 is available from the session chooser on the login screen.
- AHS (Advanced Hardware Support), a 64-bit version of Xfce with newer graphics drivers, currently with Linux kernel 6.16 (or newer) and firmware for very recent hardware (for example, AMD Ryzen and AMD Radeon RX graphics cards or 11th/12th/13th generation Intel CPUs).

The MX Linux editions differ from each other as follows:

Software	Xfce	KDE	Fluxbox
Kernel	Debian Linux kernel	Liquorix	Debian Linux kernel
Display server	X.Org Server	Wayland	X.Org Server
Sound server	PipeWire		
Multimedia	VLC and Strawberry		MPV and Audacious
Window Manager	Xfwm4	KWin	Fluxbox
Desktop Environment	Xfce	Plasma Desktop	none
Primary toolkit	GTK	Qt	C++
Primary Package Manager	MX Package Installer	Discover	MX Package Installer
Browser	Firefox		
Office suite	LibreOffice		qpdfview
Email and PIM	Thunderbird		none
Image viewer	Nomacs	Qimgv	Nomacs

== Recent releases ==
A table of current MX Linux Development Team supported releases and how long Debian will provide Long Term Support.

Version	Codename	Release	kernel	AHS kernel	Notes
MX-25.3	Infinity	September 20, 2026	6.12.107	7.2.6 Liquorix	The AHS-enabled releases now include Mesa 26.1.4. All releases includes Debian updates through 13.7 and all updates from the MX Linux repositories.
MX-25.2	Infinity	May 24, 2026	6.12.90	7.0.9 Liquorix	The AHS-enabled releases now feature Mesa 26.0.1. All releases includes Debian updates through 13.5, all updates from the MX Linux repositories, including patches for all the latest "meme bugs" in the Linux kernel.
MX-25.1	Infinity	January 12, 2026	6.12.63	6.16 Liquorix	Dual-init is now once again possible; included are both systemd and sysVinit on the same ISO.
MX-25	Infinity	9 November 2025	6.12.48	6.16 Liquorix	Changes: Xfce 4.20, Fluxbox 1.3.7, KDE/plasma 6.3.6; Debian Main Support to August 9, 2028. Debian Long Term Support to June 30, 2030.
MX-23.6	Libretto	13 April 2025	6.1.133	6.14; Liquorix	6th refresh of MX 23 with many bugfixes. Debian 12.10 "bookworm" base. New MX Tool - UEFI Manager for managing UEFI settings. Updates to: kernel, applications, and firmware.
MX-23.5	Libretto	13 January 2025	6.1.123	6.12.8; Liquorix	5th refresh of MX 23 with many bugfixes. Updates to: kernel, applications, firmware, and updated Xfce 4.20 core packages.
MX-23.4	Libretto	15 September 2024	6.1.106	6.10.10 Liquorix	MX 4th refresh. Bugfixes, updates of kernel & applications, updated firmware packages & updated Xfce core to 4.18.
MX-23.3	Libretto	19 May 2024	6.1.90	6.8.9	3rd refresh of MX 23. AHS now has the 6.8.9 Liquorix Kernel.
MX-23.2	Libretto	21 January 2024	6.1.x	6.6	2nd refresh of MX 23. AHS now has the 6.6 Liquorix Kernel.
MX-23.1	Libretto	15 October 2023	6.1.x	6.5	First refresh of MX 23. All ISOs have been updated to the newest 6.1 Kernel, and AHS now has the 6.5 Kernel.
MX-23	Libretto	31 July 2023	6.1.0	6.4.0	Xfce Desktop Environment upgraded to 4.18. Debian Main Support to June 2026. Long Term Support to June 30, 2028.
MX-21	Wildflower	21 October 2021	5.10	6.0	Debian Main Support to August 2024. Long Term Support to August 31, 2026.
Legend: Unsupported Supported Latest version Preview version

Historical releases
MX Linux 14-21

Version	Codename	Release	kernel	AHS kernel
MX-21.3 all DE's	Wildflower	15 January 2023	5.10	6.0
MX-21.2.1 all DE's	Wildflower	18 September 2022	5.10	5.18
MX-21.2 all DE's	Wildflower	28 August 2022	5.10	5.18
MX-21.1 all DE's	Wildflower	9 April 2022	5.10	5.16
MX-21 AHS	Wildflower	22 November 2021	5.10	5.14
MX-21	Wildflower	21 October 2021	5.10	
MX-19.4	Patito feo	31 March 2021	5.10	
MX-19.3	Patito feo	11 November 2020	4.19	
MX-19.2 KDE	Patito feo	16 August 2020	4.19	
19.2	Patito feo	31 May 2020	4.19	
MX-19.1	Patito feo	14 February 2020	4.19	
MX-19	Patito feo	21 October 2019	4.19	
MX-18	Continuum	4 January 2019		
MX-17	Horizon	15 December 2017		
MX-16	Metamorphosis	8 June 2017		
MX-15	Fusion	12 December 2015		
MX-14	Symbiosis	March 2014		
Legend: Unsupported Supported Latest version

== Design and features ==
=== Core architecture ===
With MX Linux being based on Debian Stable this provides high reliability and long-term support through rigorously tested packages, with updates focused on security and bug fixes rather than frequent feature additions. At its core, MX Linux integrates key components from antiX (a lightweight Debian derivative), to create a hybrid architecture. The antiX base contributes to a low-resource boot process and efficient system initialization, allowing MX Linux to run effectively on older hardware while still supporting modern PCs. Kernel options in MX Linux prioritize stability with the Debian 6.12 LTS series. For users with newer hardware, the Advanced Hardware Support (AHS) repository provides access to updated kernels, such as the 6.16 Liquorix variant in MX-25, ensuring broader compatibility without compromising the core stable base.

MX Linux supports installations on both UEFI and legacy BIOS (MBR) PCs, external drives, USB medium and other block access devices through the graphical Gazelle installer

- Handles partitioning and bootloader setup for diverse firmware environments.
- A feature for setting up zram swap device.
- The ability to "replace" an existing linux installation by preserving the /home folder. A list of found installations to replace will be used to set up a fresh /root install, with /home folders (or partition) preserved.
- Support for 64 bit UEFI Secure Boot installation. The "AHS" releases with the Liquorix kernels do not support Secure Boot.

MX Cleanup can now remove: unused dkms drivers (wifi), MX Manuals and FAQs for languages other than the default. MX Linux has a GUI-based method to change the Linux kernel.

=== MX Tools ===
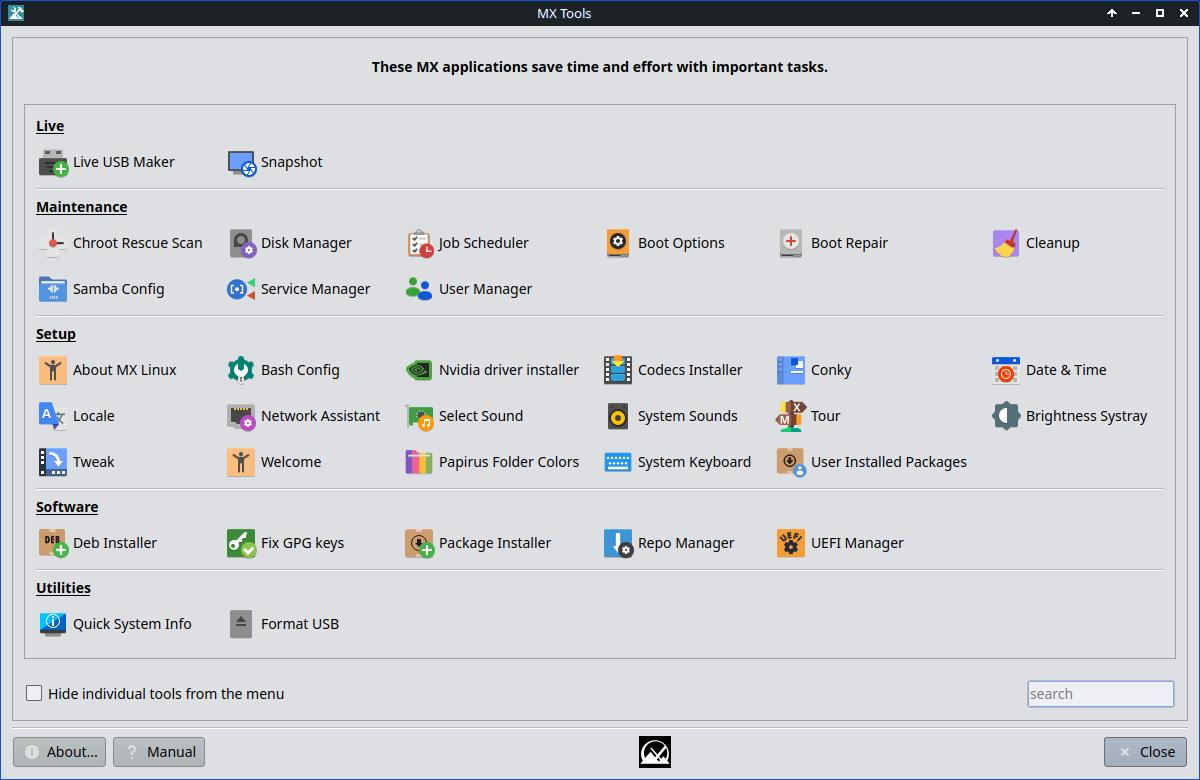

MX Tools is a suite of 38+ user-oriented utilities, many of which were developed specifically for MX Linux, while some were forked from existing antiX applications or are existing antiX applications; a couple were imported with permission from outside sources. These tools are also available in Debian Stable-based Linux distributions. The Qt-based GUI MX Tools have been migrated to Qt6.

The MX Tools (see screenshot at right) are as follows:

- Live - ISO Signature Verifier, Live USB maker, and Snapshot.
- Maintenance - Chroot Rescue Scan, Disk Manager, Job Scheduler, Boot Options, Boot Repair, Cleanup, Samba Config, Service Manager and User Manager.
- Setup - About MX Linux, Bash Config, Nvidia driver installer, Conky, Date & Time, Locale, Network Assistant, Select Sound, System Sounds, Tour, Brightness Systray, Tweak, Welcome, Papirus Folder Colors, System Keyboard, and User Installed Packages.
- Software - Deb Installer, Fix GPG keys, Package Installer, Repo Manager, Updater Settings, Updater, and UEFI Manager.
- Utilities - Quick System Info and Format USB.

==== MX Boot Repair ====
MX Boot Repair addresses bootloader issues, supporting both BIOS (legacy) and UEFI systems by reinstalling GRUB or regenerating the Grub configuration file. Launched from a live USB session, it offers options to repair GRUB on the installed system, detect operating systems.

==== MX Boot Options ====
Allows installing GRUB themes and updating boot menus for simpler startup customization and handles a common UEFI boot failure like Windows overtaking Grub in boot menu.

A few tools exist in special cases. Live-USB Kernel Updater and Remaster Control Center are stand-alone tools. Eject USB is a stand-alone tool in Fluxbox and Xfce.

A particularly popular one is MX-snapshot, a GUI tool to remaster a live session or installation into a single .ISO file. The "cloned" image is bootable from a disk or USB flash drive, maintaining all settings, allowing an installation to be completely backed up, and/or distributed with minimal administrative effort, since an advanced method of copying the file system developed by antiX Linux uses bind-mounts to perform the "heavy lifting".

=== Live vs installed ===
MX Linux can be installed or run "Live" (running from USB), unlike a Windows boot USB. Windows can only be installed (no live option). When booted from a USB, you can continue running 'Live' without being prompted to install MX Linux. This Live environment gives you a fully functional desktop experience. MX Linux accomplishes this by way of a runtime inherited from antiX to offer read-write live boot media. This can be coupled with a persistent live USB setup to save any changes to settings and new program additions.

As of November 9, 2025, there are a total of 106 MX Linux repository download mirrors worldwide in operation. The MX Linux operated repos almost always are in sync without error. They are: United States: Los Angeles (CA) & Salt Lake City (UT). Alblasserdam (Netherlands) and Milan (Italy).

=== GDebi replaced by Deb Installer ===
GDebi was an APT tool that was used to install .deb files from earlier versions of Debian. Deb Installer, a new MX Tool (GUI) can install local .deb files like the dpkg command, but with access to repositories to resolve dependencies.

=== Package management ===
Included: MX Package Installer, Synaptic, Deb Installer, Aptitude, APT and Nala. Discover is used on the KDE edition as Synaptic is not installed by default. Flatpaks are managed via the MX Package Installer. AppImage and Snaps are currently user-managed.

== System requirements ==
Note: If the default for swap of a swap FILE is accepted (left checked in MX Installer) the set size must be ADDED to the figures below.

Minimum

- 15 GB hard disk space for installation.
- 1 GB RAM for AMD64 architectures.
- Bootable CD/DVD drive or capability of booting from USB Flash memory.
- A modern Intel or AMD processor.

Recommended

- 30 GB of hard disk space, SSD for faster performance.
- 2 GB of RAM.
- Multi-core processor for good performance.
- 3D-capable graphics card for 3D desktop support.
- SoundBlaster, AC'97 or HDA-compatible sound card.
- For use as a LiveUSB, 8 GB free if using persistence.

== Derivatives ==
The developers of MX Linux have also been releasing their own "Community Re-spins", which are treated as unofficial releases. They currently are:

- MX-Workbench - meant to be a "Swiss Army knife" type of Linux running live mostly. Includes more than 90 added utilities.
- MX_Minimal - contains only the Xfce environment, Firefox and pretty much nothing else.
- MX_CLI - boots to CLI (Command line Interface) with no Xorg (GUI), no applications, pretty much nothing.

=== MX Linux Raspberry Pi respin ===
This “Ragout2” is a specialized, Debian-based Linux distribution optimized for Raspberry Pi 4, 400, and 5, combining MX Linux's, MX Linux's tools with the Pi's hardware capabilities. It features a lightweight XFCE desktop and Firefox browser. It is noted for being fast, stable, and user-friendly, supporting GPIO and common desktop apps.

A tips Wiki article is available. Previously an Orange Pi edition was offered for MX Linux 23.6. A tutorial for updating from 23.6 to 25.1 Raspberry Pi models older than Raspberry Pi 4 are not supported.

=== Community respins ===
Some community members exchange posts at the MX Linux Forum and distribute their own custom respins.

- MX Linux forum user Senpai has created a Raspberry Pi respin using MX Linux 25 as its base.
- AV Linux is a Linux distribution based on MX Linux, focusing on multimedia content creation.
- Commodore OS Vision is a community-driven Linux distribution for Commodore enthusiasts.
- extrox uses the Xfce desktop with the Compiz compositing window manager resulting in a rich desktop environment with the look and feel of KDE Plasma, but having the advantage of minimizing system resource usage.
- iDeal OS - a custom & enhanced "respin" of MX Linux with privacy and security settings enhancements.
- MX-Moksha 23.6 - MX Linux+Bodhi Linux/Moksha with a Liquorix Kernel, extra system tweaks, and custom utilities WITH NO Audio and Video production applications or Plugins.

== See also ==
- antiX Lightweight systemd free Linux distribution
- List of live CDs
- List of Linux distributions
- List of tools to create bootable USB
- List of Linux distributions that run from RAM
