= Retrocomputing =

Hobbyist use of older computer equipment

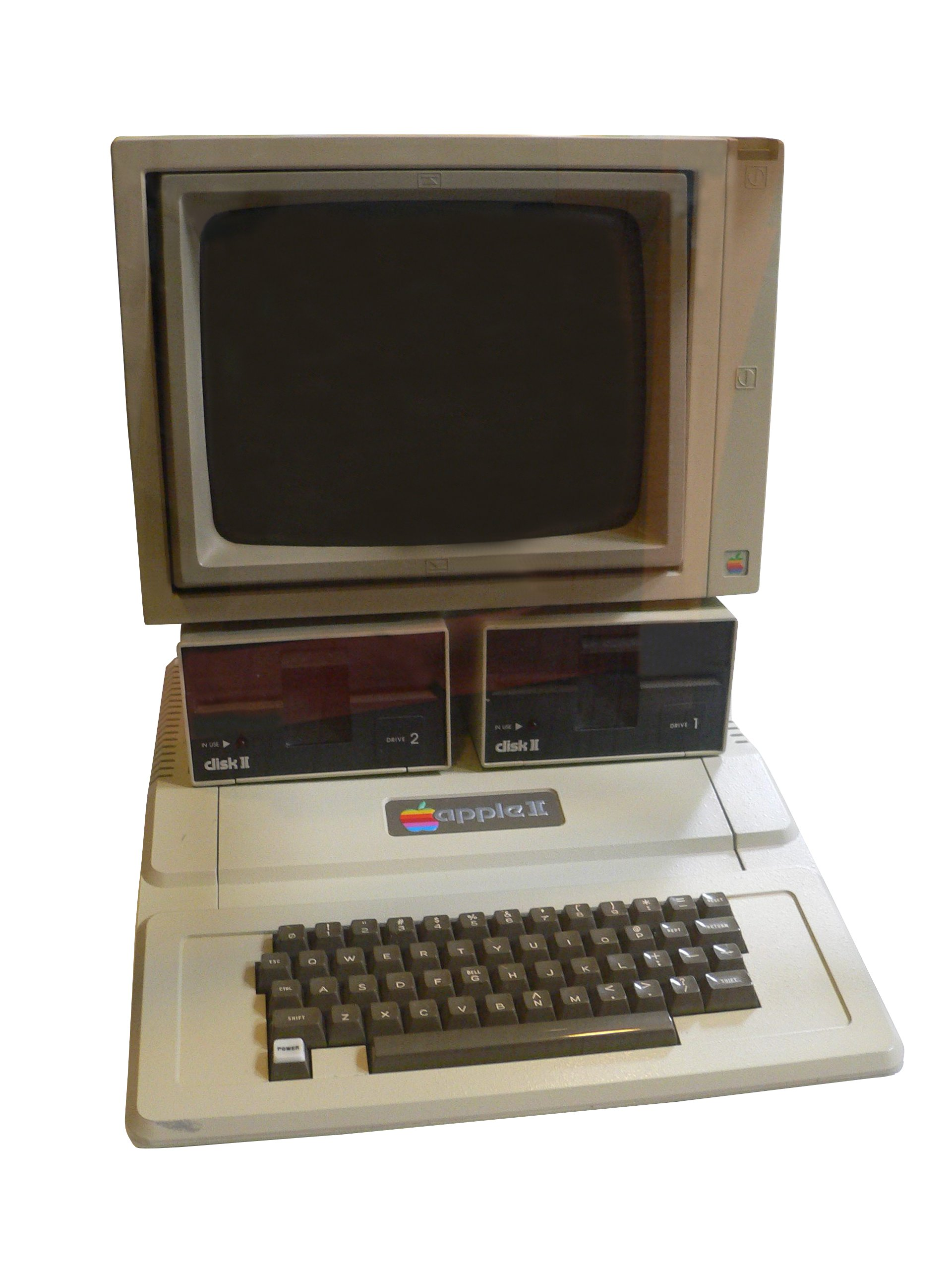
The 1977 Apple II

Retrocomputing is the current use of older computer hardware and software. Retrocomputing is usually classed as a hobby and recreation rather than a practical application of technology; enthusiasts often collect rare and valuable hardware and software for sentimental reasons.

Occasionally, however, an obsolete computer system has to be "resurrected" to run software specific to that system, to access data stored on obsolete media, or to use a peripheral that requires that system.

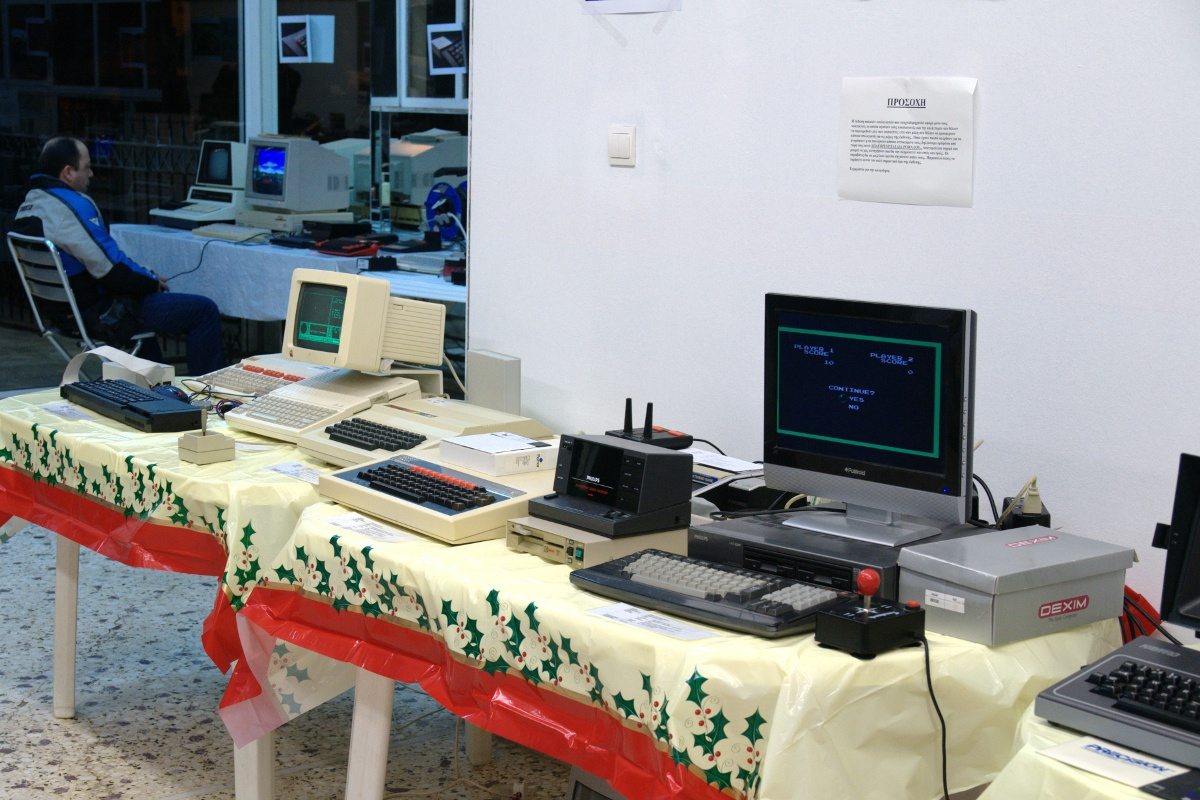
Retrosystem 2010, a retrocomputing event in Athens

Retrocomputing and retro gaming has been described as preservation activity and as aspects of the remix culture.

== Hardware retrocomputing ==
=== Historic systems ===
Retrocomputing is part of the history of computer hardware. It can be seen as the analogue of experimental archaeology in computing. Some notable examples include the reconstruction of Babbage's Difference engine (more than a century after its design) and the implementation of Plankalkül in 2000 (more than half a century since its inception).

=== "Homebrew" computers ===
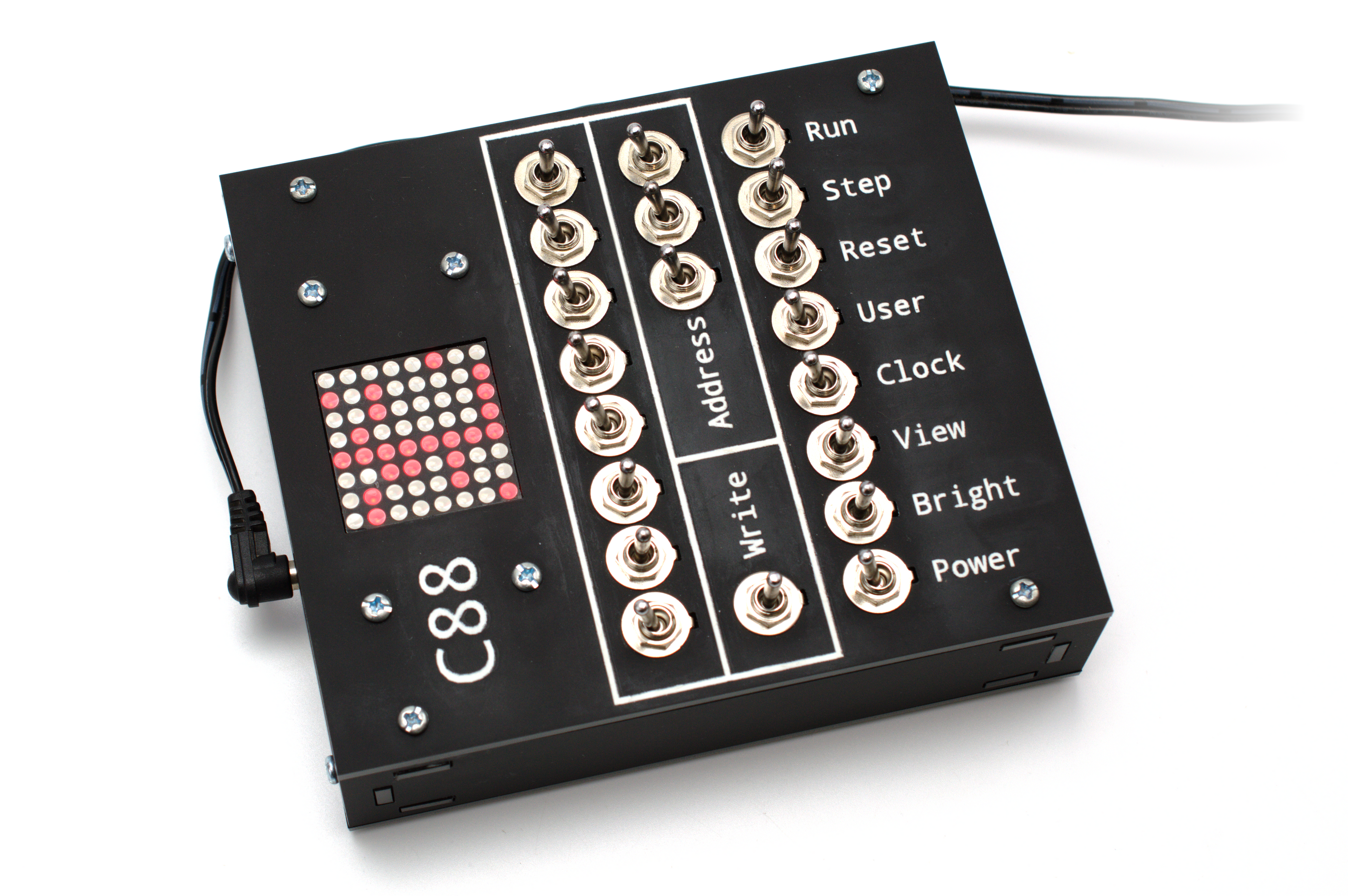
A Mini C88 eight byte homebrew computer

Some retrocomputing enthusiasts also consider the "homebrewing" (designing and building of retro- and retro-styled computers or kits), to be an important aspect of the hobby, giving new enthusiasts an opportunity to experience more fully what the early years of hobby computing were like. There are several different approaches to this end. Some are exact replicas of older systems, and some are newer designs based on the principles of retrocomputing, while others combine the two, with old and new features in the same package. Examples include:

- Device offered by IMSAI, a modern, updated, yet backward-compatible version and replica of the original IMSAI 8080, one of the most popular early personal systems;
- Several Apple 1 replicas and kits have been sold in limited quantities in recent years, by different builders, such as the "Replica 1", from Briel Computers;
- A project that used old technology in a new design is the Z80-based N8VEM;
- The Arduino Retro Computer kit is an open source, open hardware kit one can build which has a BASIC interpreter. There is also a version of the Arduino Retro Computer that can be hooked up to a TV;
- There is at least one remake of the Commodore 64 using an FPGA configured to emulate the 6502;
- MSX 2/2+ compatible do-it-yourself kit GR8BIT, designed for the hands-on education in electronics, deliberately employing old and new concepts and devices (high-capacity SRAMs, micro-controllers and FPGA);
- The MEGA65, a Commodore 65 compatible computer;
- The Commander X16, an ongoing project by David Murray that hopes to build a new 8-bit platform inspired by the Commodore 64, using off-the-shelf modern parts.
- The C256 Foenix and its different versions, a new retro computer family based on the WDC65C816 processor. FPGAs are used to simulate CBM custom chips and has the power of an Amiga with its graphic and sound capabilities.
- Grant Searle collection of homebrew 8-bit projects.

== Software retrocomputing ==
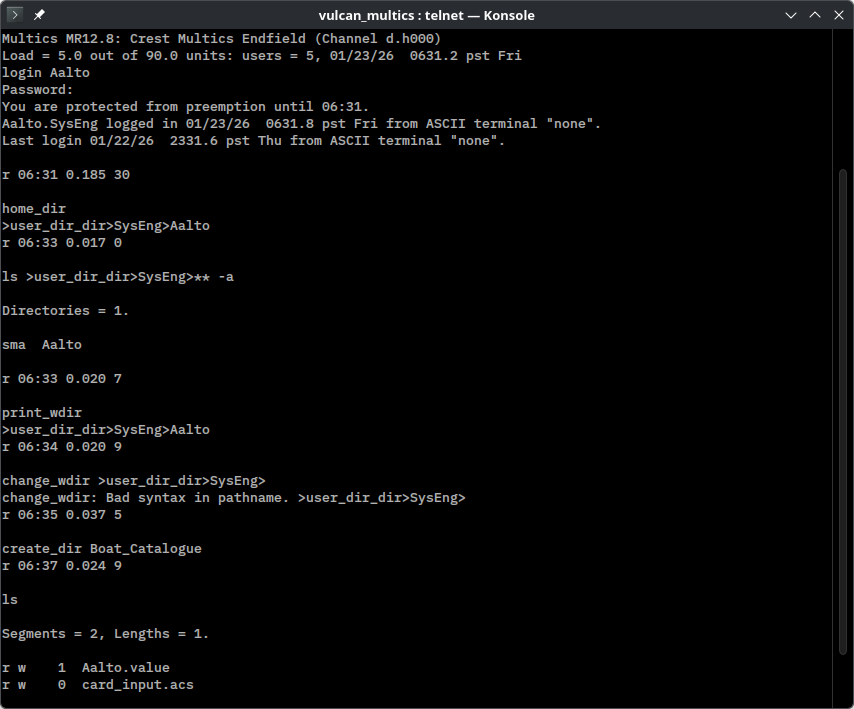
DPS8M Simulator running Multics MR12.8 on a modern Linux system

As old computer hardware becomes harder to maintain, there has been increasing interest in computer simulation. This is especially the case with old mainframe computers, which have largely been scrapped, and have space, power, and environmental requirements unaffordable by the average user. The memory size and speed of current systems enable simulation of many old systems to run faster than that system on original hardware.

One popular simulator, the history simulator SIMH, offers simulations for over 50 historic systems, from the 1950s through the present. The Hercules emulator simulates the IBM System/360 family from System/360 to 64-bit System/z. A simulator is available for the Honeywell Multics system. An online simulator is available for the Altair 8800 and it runs the actual Altair BASIC

Software for most older systems was not copyrighted, and therefore falls into the public domain, so there is a wide variety of available software to run on these simulators. In a few cases, software for older systems was released into open source by the copyright holders, such as Groupe Bull (the copyright holder of Multics) which released the source code for MR12.5, the final official 1992 Multics release, to MIT in 2006. The release of Multics source code enabled enthusiasts to fix bugs or make improvements, with later open source releases of Multics were released as late as 2023.

Some emulations are used by businesses, as running production software in a simulator is usually faster, cheaper, and more reliable than running it on original hardware.

== In popular culture ==
In an interview with Conan O'Brien in May 2014, George R. R. Martin revealed that he writes his books using WordStar 4.0, an MS-DOS application dating back to 1987.

US-based streaming video provider Netflix released a multiple-choice movie branded to be part of their Black Mirror series, called Bandersnatch. The protagonist is a teenage programmer working on a contract to deliver a video-game adaptation of a fantasy novel for an 8-bit computer in 1984. The multiple storylines revolve around the emotions and mental health issues resulting from a reality-perception mismatch between a new generation of computer-savvy teenagers and twenty-somethings, and their care givers.

A number of notable YouTubers have covered the genre of retrocomputing, including Lazy Game Reviews, Nostalgia Nerd, Adrian's Digital Basement, The 8-Bit Guy, and J-Tech95.

== Education ==
Due to their relative low complexity together with other technical advantages, 8-bit computers are frequently re-discovered for education, especially for introductory programming classes in elementary schools. Some 8-bit computers, notably the Commodore 64, would upon powering on, directly present a programming environment; there are no distractions, and no need for additional features or connectivity. The BASIC language is a simple-to-learn programming language that has access to the entire system without having to load libraries for sound, graphics, math, etc. The focus of the programming language is on efficiency; in particular, one command does one thing immediately (e.g. COLOR 0,6 turns the screen green).

== See also ==
- History of computing hardware
- Vintage Computer Festival
- Computer History Museum
- Computer Conservation Society
- Living Computers: Museum + Labs
- Retro gaming
  - Fantasy video game console
