= Commodore USA =

US computer company founded in 2010

Commodore USA, LLC

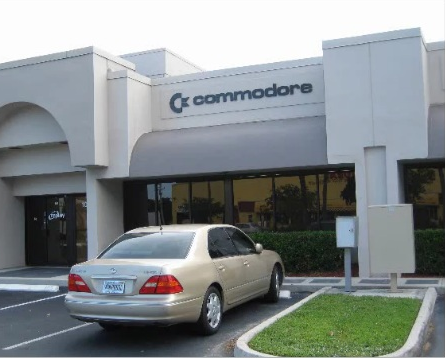
- Headquarters in Fort Lauderdale, Florida
- Founded: 2010
- Defunct: 2013
- Headquarters: Fort Lauderdale, Florida, USA
- Key people: Barry Altman (deceased on December 8, 2012); Leo Nigro

Commodore USA, LLC was a computer company based in Pompano Beach, Florida, with additional facilities in Fort Lauderdale, Florida. Commodore USA, LLC was founded in April 2010. The company's goal was to sell a new line of PCs using the classic Commodore and Amiga name brands of personal computers, having licensed the Commodore brand from Commodore Licensing BV on August 25, 2010 and the Amiga brand from Amiga, Inc. on August 31, 2010.

After the 2012 demise of Commodore USA, the claimed Commodore brand license turned out to be invalid, as a court ruled in 2013 that neither Asiarim Corporation nor its subsidiary Commodore Licensing BV ever were in a position to grant such a license. The court found that the Commodore trademarks were held by C=Holdings BV, and held Asiarim liable for trademark infringement. The Amiga brand license too was disputed by Hyperion Entertainment, on the basis of a 2009 settlement agreement between Hyperion and Amiga.

The last news release from the website is dated March 21, 2012. In January 2013, it was revealed that founder and driving force Barry S. Altman died of cancer on December 8, 2012. The last post on Commodore USA's forum came from Leo Nigro (Chief Technical Officer) on the 9th of December concerning the Amiga line.

== Products ==
=== Phoenix ===
The Commodore Phoenix was a keyboard computer resembling an updated style of the Commodore 64. It was originally designed and manufactured by Cybernet as a space-saving workstation.

=== Commodore 64x ===
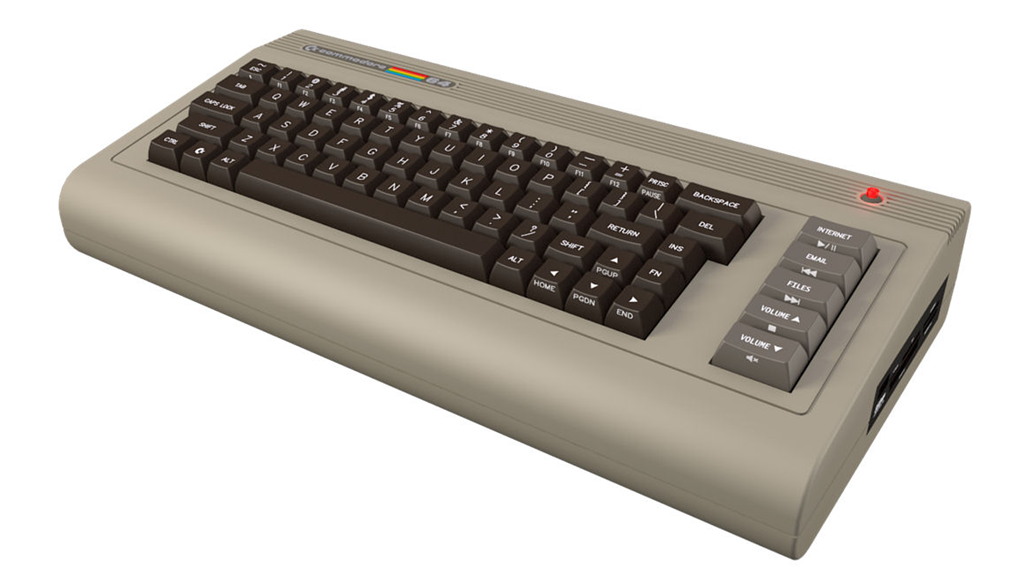
2011 Commodore C64x

The flagship product for Commodore USA, named the Commodore 64x, was contained in a partially redesigned and updated Commodore 64 form factor. The machine looked like the original Commodore 64, except with a slightly updated keyboard and power supply. The base model has an Intel Atom processor and an NVIDIA Ion 2 graphics card. The top version released on August 13, 2011 was called the "C64x Extreme" and featured an Intel Core i7 CPU with 8 GB RAM and 3 TB hard drive using the Intel Sandy Bridge chipset. There was also a barebones version of the C64x shell without a motherboard, power supply, or optical drive or hard drive, that was meant to encourage hobbyist enthusiasts to install their preferred Mini-ATX motherboard.

=== VIC ===
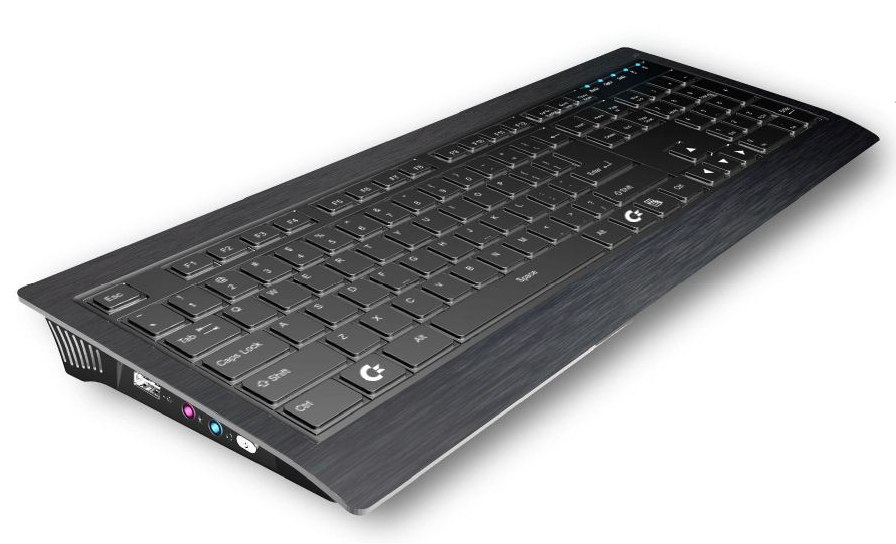
2011 Commodore Vic-Slim

The revamped Vic product line is a group of keyboard computers with original Commodore function keys. The Vic Slim had a keyboard that was the same size as most extended keyboards, but used a relatively slow Intel Atom CPU. The Vic Pro was a keyboard computer that also contained a built-in touchpad, memory card reader, and two fans.

=== Amiga ===
A product line of Amiga branded x86 computers based upon the Intel i7 chipset featuring emulation of the classic Amiga systems built-in. The only available Amiga sold so far is the Amiga Mini which was a barebone computer. The Amiga Mio was offered as a refresh of the Amiga Mini, but was discontinued on November 4, 2013.

=== Commodore OS ===
As of November 11, 2011, Commodore USA has released a beta version of Commodore OS, a Linux Mint-based operating system to be used throughout its product range. It is a media center operating system, bundled with a variety of free open source software. The full version of this beta operating system is available only systems purchased from Commodore USA. It does support emulation of some of the previous Commodore operating systems.

As Commodore os 2.0 and on, Leo Nigro allows any computers to have the Commodore OS.

== History ==
Commodore USA consistently focused on bundling an alternate operating system, preferring Linux. It previously claimed that their machines support every operating system available from Ubuntu specifically, to Windows and even OSx86, but disclaiming that they do not and will not sell Mac OS X. Commodore USA's online store sold Microsoft Windows separately and bundled Linux in their keyboard computers. Later, Commodore USA announced that they would officially support, develop, and ship their computers with AROS, but shifted their focus on redesigning Linux as Amiga Workbench 5, and Amiga Workbench X, but decided to name it Commodore OS and dropped all plans of making it resemble an Amiga-like operating system due to additional legal proceedings.

Examples of announced products that appear to have been cancelled are Invictus and Amigo. The Commodore USA website was redesigned and an interactive forum was launched at the same time. High-end Amiga-PC designs were posted on the website. The company licensed the Commodore brand from Commodore Licensing, BV on August 25, 2010. It licensed the Amiga brand from Amiga, Inc. shortly afterwards on August 31.

Barry Altman, founder of Commodore USA, died on December 8, 2012. The molds and existing stock for the Commodore C64x were sold to My Retro Computer Ltd in the UK who continue to sell units in a variety of colors and up to date configurations.

== Controversy ==
Commodore USA has been criticized for altering previously announced plans, threatening legal action against an OS News writer's article, and mistakenly attempting to obtain licensing from a Commodore licensee unauthorised to sublicense. Commodore USA was alleged to have used various images, artwork, and designs without the permission of the original authors. Apparently they chose to do so in some cases because they could not contact the creators to ask permission. Further controversy surrounding the company's image use policy revolved around alleged photographs of the C64x assembly line in China, revealed to have been old promotional images for a facility in Augsburg owned by Fujitsu.

Some of Commodore USA's announced products were cancelled since their announcement due to intellectual property disagreements, most notably concerning the rights of licensor Amiga Inc. with regards to the possible use of AROS in future Amiga systems from Commodore USA. Others have simply been cancelled as the business plan evolves away from their sector of the market.

== Reception ==
Lance Ulanoff writing in PCMag criticized the new Commodore 64 as a "none-too-cheap imitation of the real thing", criticizing it for using modern components. Commodore USA has responded to this position by pointing out the high cost of researching and developing original chipsets, and the relative expense and lack of mass-market software support for other CPU ISAs such as Power ISA or Motorola 68000 family.

Commodore USA attempted to address these concerns by announcing Commodore OS, intended to be released with Commodore USA systems. Their new Amiga product line is not compatible with original Amiga systems including the operating system, AmigaOS, which is in fact developed by a separate company. Commodore USA originally intended to develop an AROS to be bundled with their Amiga systems; however, this plan was later publicly discarded by CEO Barry Altman.
