= The 8-Bit Guy =

American YouTuber

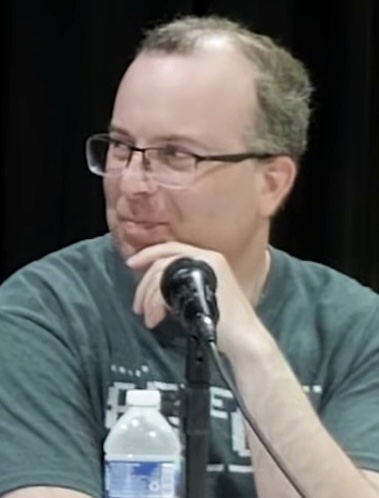
- Murray in 2021
- Born: 1975 (age 50–51)

YouTube information
- Channel: The 8-Bit Guy
- Years active: 2006–present
- Genre: Retrocomputing
- Subscribers: 1.47 million
- Views: 292 million
- Last updated: September 3, 2026
- Website: www.the8bitguy.com

David Murray (born 1975), professionally known as The 8-Bit Guy, is an American retrocomputing enthusiast and video game developer who runs a YouTube channel under the same name.

== Content and history ==
Murray launched his YouTube channel in 2006 under the username adric22. He worked on repairing and refurbishing iBook G3 and G4 laptops and later on MacBooks, buying and selling them on eBay, and later from his own website. He called himself The iBook Guy. He made videos to show how he repairs some of the equipment, but had made his living with the actual repairs, as well as resales. In 2011, he shut down his repair business.

Murray noticed his general videos about computing were attracting more subscribers. In 2015, he renamed his primary channel to "The 8-Bit Guy" and focused on retrocomputing. He says an average episode takes about 15 hours to produce.

Murray ran several different YouTube channels about keyboard instruments from the 1980s, coin collecting, (air) guns, and ran a comedy channel, although the latter three did not have as much popularity as his retrocomputing videos, so he stopped uploading videos to them.

Murray was dissatisfied with his long-used in-home filming studio, so in 2020, he began construction on a small building in his backyard which would hold his new studio. In 2021, the new studio was finished and became Murray's primary filming location.

On January 2, 2024, Murray announced that after two years of falling views and revenue, he would shift focus away from YouTube to the X16 project and a local arcade venue he partly owns in Bedford, Texas. As of May 2026 David has left both the X16 project and the arcade business.

Murray is known for the Planet XX series of games, with the original Planet X1 being developed for the VIC-20 in the late 2000s early 2010s. This was followed up with Planet X2 for the Commodore 64. Another installation was Planet X3 designed for MS-DOS. The most recent induction in the series was Planet X16 designed for his Commander X16 platform.

The channel is known for its videos on restorations of old computers and retrocomputer development content, and more generally on demonstrations of old technology.

David Murray was originally a co-founder of the Time Rift Arcade in Bedford, Texas but is no longer involved. Murray is also passionate about electric cars, and has published videos about them on his channel. Murray co-hosts the GeekBits podcast alongside his brother Mike Murray and friend Craig Bowes.

== Game releases ==
Murray has developed video games designed to run on old computers, including:

- Planet X1 for the VIC-20,
- Planet X2 for Commodore 64,
- Planet X3 for MS-DOS,
- Planet X16 for the Commander X16, and
- Attack of the PETSCII Robots for the Commodore PET. The game has since been ported to many other platforms, including the VIC-20, Commodore 64, Commodore 128, Amiga, Apple II, ZX Spectrum, and Atari 8-bit computers.

Murray has demonstrated the development of these games on his YouTube channel. Additionally, he has developed PETDraw for various Commodore computers, a pseudo-raster drawing software using PETSCII.

== Commander X16 retrocomputer ==
Murray is working on the Commander X16, a new 8-bit computer inspired by the Commodore 64 and designed to be largely period-accurate to it, but made using modern off-the-shelf parts (Note: except for a few new old stock chips such as the YM2151) mostly analogous to period parts but with better-assured continued availability. (Note: As of the 2020s, there is a lot of price gouging and counterfeiting in period electronic parts, hence relying on genuine period parts would impact affordability.)

== Personal life ==
Murray lives with his wife and daughter in the Dallas–Fort Worth area in Texas. He has lived in his current house in Kennedale since the mid-1990s. Prior to their buyout, he used to work for AST Research as a tech support specialist. His second cousins were musicians Dimebag Darrell and Vinnie Paul of Pantera.
