= Vintage Computer Festival =

Annual computer history event

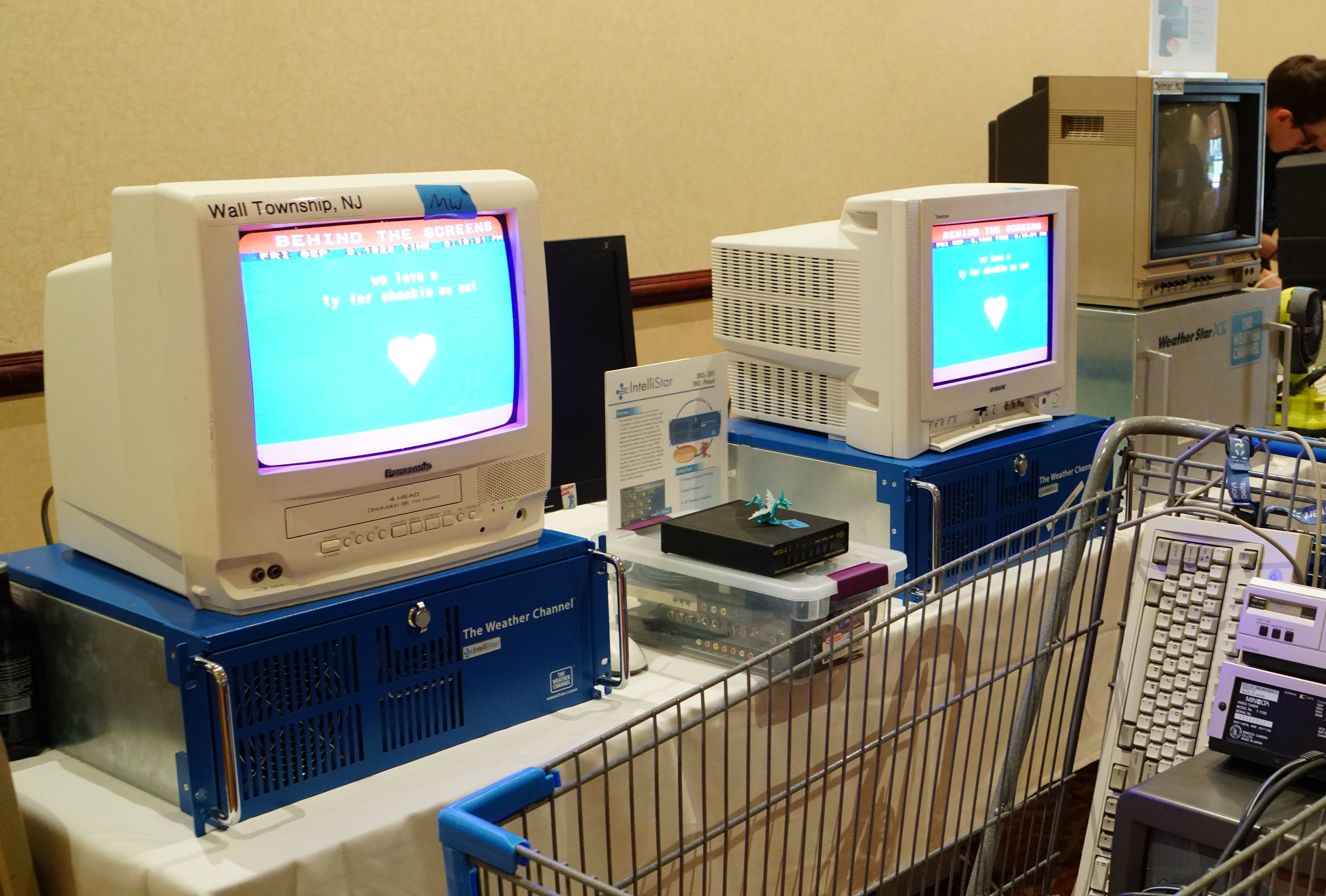
The Weather Channel IntelliStar computers and a WeatherStar XL on display at VCF Midwest 2022.

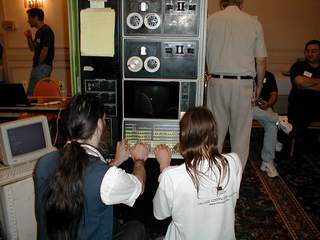
DEC PDP-12 at the first VCF East, Marlborough, Massachusetts, 2001

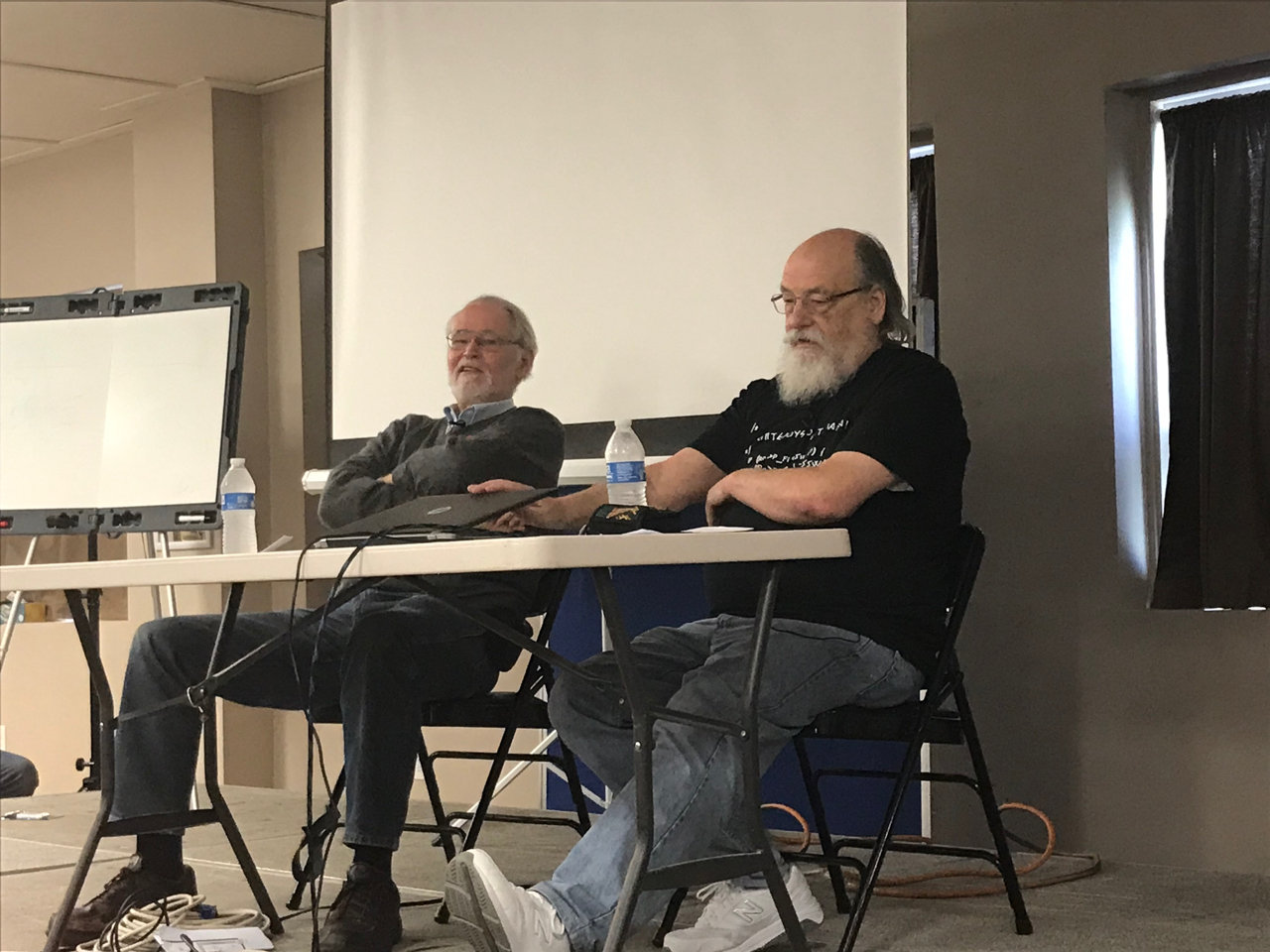
Brian Kernighan interviews Ken Thompson at VCF East 2019.

The Vintage Computer Festival (VCF) is an international event celebrating the history of computing. It is held annually in various locations around the United States and various countries internationally. It was founded by Sellam Ismail in 1997.

== Purpose ==
The Vintage Computer Festival promotes the preservation of "obsolete" computers by offering the public a chance to experience the technologies, people and stories that embody the remarkable tale of the computer revolution. VCF events include hands-on exhibit halls, VIP keynote speeches, consignment, technical classes, and other attractions depending on venue. It is consequently one of the premiere physical markets for antique computer hardware.

== History ==
Sellam Ismail designed the Vintage Computer Festival in 1997. Beginning as a post on the ClassicCmp Mailing List, Ismail first came up with the "Classical Computer Convention", but quickly focused on the Vintage Computer Festival. The initial series started on October 25-26, 1997.

== Events ==
The Vintage Computer Federation runs VCF East (Wall Township, New Jersey), VCF Pacific Northwest (Seattle, Washington), and VCF West (Mountain View, California). Independent editions include, VCF SoCal (Southern California / Orange, California), VCF Midwest (metro Chicago, Illinois), VCF Southwest (Dallas-Fort Worth Metroplex) VCF Europa (Munich and Berlin, Germany; Vintage Computer Festival Zürich, Switzerland), Vintage Computer Festival GB, and VCF Southeast (Atlanta, Georgia).

== See also ==
- WinWorld
