= The Walking Dead (comic book) =

Comic book series

- Cover of The Walking Dead #1 by Tony Moore featuring series protagonist Rick Grimes

Publication information
- Publisher: Image Comics
- Schedule: Monthly
- Format: Ongoing series
- Genre: Zombie apocalypse
- Publication date: October 2003 – July 2019
- No. of issues: 193

Creative team
- Created by: Robert Kirkman
- Written by: Robert Kirkman
- Artists: Tony Moore (#1–6); Charlie Adlard (#7–193)
- Pencillers: Tony Moore (#1–6); Charlie Adlard (#7–193)
- Inkers: Tony Moore (#1–6); Charlie Adlard (#7–193); Stefano Gaudiano (#115–192)
- Letterers: Robert Kirkman (#1–19); Rus Wooton (#20–193)
- Colorists: Tony Moore (#1–5); Cliff Rathburn (#6–193); Dave McCaig (#1-, colored reprint)
- Editors: Aubrey Sitterson (#55–70); Sina Grace (#67–96); Sean Mackiewicz (#97–193)

The Walking Dead is an American zombie apocalypse comic book series created by writer Robert Kirkman with artwork by artist Tony Moore for the first six issues and cover art for the first twenty-four. Charlie Adlard provided the artwork for the remainder of the series. Beginning in 2003 and published by Image Comics, the series ran for 193 issues, with Kirkman unexpectedly ending the series in 2019. Apart from a few specials, the comic was published primarily in black and white. It began publishing colorized versions issue by issue, colored by Dave McCaig, starting in October 2020.

The comic book series focuses on Rick Grimes, a Kentucky deputy who is shot in the line of duty and awakens from a coma in a zombie apocalypse that has resulted in a state-wide quarantine. After joining with some other survivors, he gradually takes on the role of leader of a community as it struggles to survive the zombie apocalypse. The Walking Dead received the 2007 and 2010 Eisner Award for Best Continuing Series at San Diego Comic-Con.

The AMC television series The Walking Dead (2010–2022) loosely follows the storyline of the comic book. The Walking Dead franchise has also spawned multiple additional media properties, including six companion television series (the first two of which were Fear the Walking Dead and The Walking Dead: World Beyond), eight webisode series, video games (starting with The Walking Dead: The Game), and various additional publications, including novels (starting with The Walking Dead: Rise of the Governor).

== Publication history ==
Kirkman was a fan of zombie films such as the Living Dead series and Zombi 2 as well as zombie video games such as Resident Evil. The original pitch by Kirkman and Moore was for a follow-up to George A. Romero's Night of the Living Dead, with the series taking place in the 1960s. Image Comics co-founder Jim Valentino suggested using an original concept instead so the creators would own the property outright. The pitch was revised into an original story, taking a more traditional approach to a modern zombie survival tale. The revised pitch was again rejected, however, for being too "normal". Kirkman then pitched it again with a new added twist that the plague was sent by aliens, and that the comic would be more of an alien invasion story. Kirkman had no intention of making the comic about aliens, but felt that the lie was necessary to get the comic published.

The Walking Dead debuted in 2003, published by Image Comics, with art by Tony Moore for the first six issues and Cliff Rathburn shading the art after issue #5. Charlie Adlard took over as artist on issue #7, after he was approached by Kirkman due to Moore's difficulties with meeting deadlines. Moore also drew the cover art for the first 24 issues and the first four trade paperbacks. The remainder were done by Adlard. Most issues of the comic featured "Letter Hacks", several pages at the end where Kirkman discussed the issue, oftentimes answering letters, mail, and emails sent by readers of the comic. Kirkman usually co-wrote the section with his editor, Sean Mackiewicz.

When the television series premiered in October 2010, Image Comics announced The Walking Dead Weekly. The first 52 issues of the series began to be reprinted on January 5, 2011, with one issue per week for a year. The series is periodically re-published in trade paperbacks which contain six issues each, hardcover books with twelve issues and occasional bonus material, omnibus editions of twenty-four issues, and compendium editions of forty-eight issues.

In May 2018, Image Comics and its imprint Skybound Entertainment, the company that has driven development of The Walking Dead comic series since 2010, jointly announced The Walking Dead Day. The fan-oriented event was for October 13, 2018 and coincided with the release of a Walking Dead #1 15th Anniversary Variant Edition, with cover art by Charlie Adlard. A select number of The Walking Dead Day participating local comic shops became part of the comic's story line, with their own special edition of Adlard's anniversary cover, featuring the store's logo incorporated into the cover art. The company also noted that additional limited edition collectibles and festivities would be announced at a future date, prior to the October 2018 event.

On July 3, 2019, Kirkman confirmed through the "Letter Hacks" section of Issue #193 that the issue had concluded the series, with no previous announcements or warnings beforehand. Kirkman opted to end the comic on his own terms; he stated in his letter in issue #193 that part of the reason to end was that he feared he lacked material to continue the series for several more issues. He had envisioned the series to end around the time that Rick Grimes and his allies reach the Commonwealth, a large human community protected from the walkers, as this would allow him to give a complete arc. However, he found he got there too soon in terms of issues, with the Commonwealth first appearing around issue #150, and Kirkman feared there was no way he could get to an issue #300 with what ideas he had left.

This ending came following the death of Rick Grimes, in issue #192. Kirkman kept the series' end a secret as he worked with Adlard to create cover art and solicitation information for Diamond Comic Distributors for non-existent issues through #196 that would have been released through October 2019, creating a storyline that hinted at the death of Carl Grimes, Rick's son, in the wake of Rick's death. Kirkman said that The Walking Dead comic was always built on surprise, and felt that it was necessary to surprise readers with the end of the series after covering enough of the aftermath of Rick's death in issues #192 and 193.

Image Comics announced in July 2020 that it will be republishing the full run of The Walking Dead in full color, with coloring by Dave McCaig. The first issue of the reprint was released on October 7, 2020, with subsequent comics beginning to be released twice a month from November 2020 onward. There are no present plans to release these in trade paperbacks.

== Story arcs ==
No.	Title	Release date	ISBN
1	Days Gone Bye	May 4, 2004	1-58240-358-9
Rick Grimes, a sheriff's deputy from Cynthiana, Kentucky, is wounded in the line of duty and emerges from a coma to find the world overrun with the undead. He is then led in to a small camp of survivors; among them are Rick's wife Lori, his son Carl, and his police partner Shane Walsh. Following a fatal zombie attack, Shane tries to murder Rick, having had a one-night stand and become obsessed with Lori. Carl then shoots Shane to protect his father.
2	Miles Behind Us	November 4, 2004	1-58240-413-5
Rick becomes the group's leader. The survivors leave Atlanta and travel across hostile territory in search of a safer refuge, during which Lori is revealed to be pregnant. After a few failed attempts, the group finds new friends, and eventually, an abandoned prison.
3	Safety Behind Bars	May 18, 2005	1-58240-487-9
Inside the prison, the survivors meet a few inmates alive. Two of the group members commit suicide and one of the inmates is executed after going on a killing spree.
4	The Heart's Desire	November 30, 2005	1-58240-530-1
The group manages to quell the inmates' attempted rebellion. A woman named Michonne arrives at the prison seeking refuge and causes tension among the survivors. Rick's leadership is questioned, and the survivors form a council with four co-leaders.
5	The Best Defense	September 27, 2006	1-58240-612-X
Rick, Michonne and Glenn find a small town called Woodbury, where a well-armed and organized group of survivors has taken refuge. Woodbury's leader, the Governor, captures Rick's group, then interrogates and tortures them.
6	This Sorrowful Life	April 11, 2007	1-58240-684-7
Rick and his group manage to escape from Woodbury with the help of other Woodburians. The Governor is badly mutilated by Michonne. Rick informs his group of what took place in Woodbury and tells them to prepare for battle.
7	The Calm Before	September 26, 2007	1-58240-828-9
The group continues their lives, and Lori's baby is born, until the Governor arrives at the prison, ready for a battle.
8	Made to Suffer	June 27, 2008	1-58240-883-1
The Governor's army attacks the prison but retreats. A few of the survivors decide to flee the prison to avoid the Governor's expected retaliation. The Governor attacks again, killing almost everyone inside. The guilt-ridden soldier who killed Lori and her newborn daughter on the Governor's orders kills him. With the prison burning and in shambles, Rick and Carl escape.
9	Here We Remain	January 1, 2009	1-60706-022-1
After the prison's destruction and his band is separated, Rick and Carl search for shelter. Rick's physical and mental state begin to unravel, while Carl grows increasingly independent and apathetic. They eventually reunite with their other survivors. Three strangers, Abraham, Rosita and Eugene, arrive and inform the group that they are on a mission to Washington, D.C. to cure the plague. Rick's band decides to join their journey.
10	What We Become	August 12, 2009	1-60706-075-2
Rick, Abraham, and Carl head to Rick's hometown to find weapons. They discover Morgan, whom Rick met when he woke up from his coma, and he joins Rick's survivors.
11	Fear the Hunters	January 6, 2010	1-60706-122-8
Rick and company continue their journey to Washington and begin to suspect they are being stalked by someone in the woods. They meet a pastor, Gabriel, and join him at his church. Dale is kidnapped from the church during the night by a band of cannibals. Dale is reunited with his friends before he dies. Rick's group, enraged, hunt down the cannibals and torture them to death.
12	Life Among Them	July 21, 2010	1-60706-254-2
The group continue to Washington, during which they discover that Eugene was lying about having a cure to stop the outbreak. They run across a friendly man named Aaron who claims he is trustworthy and can escort them to a large, walled-off community of survivors called the Alexandria Safe-Zone, led by a man named Douglas Monroe. Rick's weary band finds Alexandria's stability a welcome change although they remain suspicious.
13	Too Far Gone	November 24, 2010	1-60706-329-8
Rick's group settles into the Alexandria Safe-Zone and take jobs in the community. Rick, as constable, tries to increase safety and stability when he stops a dangerous man inside the community. Scavengers arrive and threaten the community. Alexandria wins the battle but alert a massive herd of hundreds of zombies to their presence. Rick takes command of the community.
14	No Way Out	July 15, 2011	1-60706-392-1
Rick and company become community leaders despite objections from some of its residents. Alexandria's citizens discover they have bigger problems when they discover the zombie horde breaching Alexandria's walls and overrunning the community. During the battle, Douglas is killed after accidentally shooting Carl in the eye. Alexandria's residents face down the horde and save their town.
15	We Find Ourselves	December 7, 2011	1-60706-440-5
The Alexandria Safe-Zone recuperates from the horde's attack, and Rick makes decisions that will lead to Alexandria's long-term sustainability. Carl is in a coma following his injury; his survival is unclear. Some residents question the bold choices Rick makes for their community and attempt to seize control of Alexandria. Rick quashes the rebellion. Carl awakens with amnesia.
16	A Larger World	June 6, 2012	1-60706-559-2
Alexandrians encounter a man named Paul Monroe while searching the wastes for supplies. Monroe claims he is a recruiter for a nearby band of 200 or more people called the Hilltop Colony. Rick and others go to the Hilltop Colony and find its appearance seems to be even safer than that of Alexandria, although it has a dangerous enemy, The Saviors. The Saviors demand half of the colony's food and supplies, in exchange for killing nearby walkers.
17	Something to Fear	November 21, 2012	1-60706-615-7
Rick and crew confront the Hilltop Colony's enemy, the Saviors, a brutal gang led by a man named Negan. Rick underestimates the Saviors and dismisses their threat level until his best friends, including Glenn and Abraham, are savagely killed. Alexandria is forced to begin paying tribute — half of their supplies — to the Saviors. Enraged, Rick vows to kill Negan.
18	What Comes After	June 5, 2013	1-60706-687-4
Rick's band learns what living under Negan's rules really means. Rick devises a new strategy to deal with the Saviors, but a member of his group disappears after the Saviors collect their payment from Alexandria. Rick is forced to halt his plan. Paul takes Rick to request help from an exotic man named Ezekiel, leader of a community called the Kingdom. The Kingdom is based in Washington, D.C., where one of the Saviors makes an independent offer to help battle Negan.
19	March to War	November 19, 2013	1-60706-818-4
Rick, Paul, and Ezekiel decide to trust Dwight, a Savior, and launch their attempt to end the Saviors' reign. The three communities ally to formulate an assault, but Negan arrives early to collect his tribute from Alexandria. The alliance seizes the opportunity to assassinate Negan, but Negan retreats and declares war.
20	All Out War - Part One	March 5, 2014	1-60706-882-6
Rick leads his united army, with the Hilltop and the Kingdom, in an attack against the Sanctuary, the Saviors' base. Rick's forces seize an early advantage and trap Negan inside the Sanctuary, but their attack on Negan's outposts falters as many of Rick's closest friends fall. They wonder if their initial victory was simple luck. Negan mounts an eventual counterattack on Alexandria, and its situation goes from bad to worse.
21	All Out War - Part Two	July 23, 2014	1-63215-030-1
With the war at its peak, Negan attacks Alexandria and the Hilltop and destroys the former's defenses. On the brink of defeat, Rick offers Negan a truce as a trap. Negan falls for Rick's ruse. Rick slashes Negan's throat and demands that war cease. Negan survives the attack as Rick's prisoner.
22	A New Beginning	November 5, 2014	1-63215-041-7
Two years have passed since the war with Negan. Civilization has been rebuilt and the communities have established a successful trade network. Carl moves to Hilltop. A new group arrives in Alexandria, and they meet the imprisoned Negan.
23	Whispers into Screams	April 29, 2015	1-63215-258-4
A new threat emerges as living people disguised as walkers attack, calling themselves The Whisperers, whose leader is called Alpha. Tensions arise within Hilltop after Carl loses his temper. Some residents question both him and their leader. Meanwhile, Paul captures a member of the Whisperers and discovers the full implications of this new threat to Hilltop.
24	Life and Death	August 26, 2015	1-63215-402-1
Carl continues to learn more about The Whisperers, and a survivor's fate is decided while another steps down. Blunders are made, and a deadly promise given that is all too real. Lines are crossed that will affect everyone.
25	No Turning Back	March 30, 2016	1-63215-659-8
Rick reveals the survivors who died at the hands of Alpha and the Whisperers. Residents of the communities demand retaliation, and some question Rick's leadership. Rick declares war on the Whisperers and must use a former enemy as a last resort.
26	Call to Arms	September 26, 2016	1-63215-917-1
With the conflict against the Whisperers closing in, Rick must ensure the readiness of the community's newly formed militia while also dealing with various conflicts within the walls of each community, including the escape of a dangerous prisoner.
27	The Whisperer War	March 1, 2017	1-5343-0052-X
The militia wars with the Whisperers; both sides suffer tremendous casualties. The Whisperers attack one of the communities and destroy its defenses. With one last trump card, the Whisperers lead an ocean of walkers towards Alexandria.
28	A Certain Doom	September 12, 2017	1-5343-0244-1
The enormous horde of walkers reaches Alexandria so Rick and his community must survive while others try to steer the horde to the sea. The opportunistic Saviors make their move on an overwhelmed community.
29	Lines We Cross	March 13, 2018	1-5343-0497-5
Recent events have thrown Alexandria into turmoil, and now Rick, Dwight, Eugene and Negan all have something to prove.
30	New World Order	September 11, 2018	1-5343-0884-9
Eugene leads a group on a new mission to Ohio, where they encounter a new community unlike anything they have seen before.
31	The Rotten Core	March 6, 2019	1-5343-1052-5
Rick leads the Commonwealth's Governor, Pamela Milton, on a tour of the various communities aligned with Alexandria. Terrible things begin to happen very quickly.
32	Rest in Peace	August 13, 2019	1-5343-1241-2
Tensions erupt in the Commonwealth, almost breaking out into a major war. Rick stands in the middle of a major conflict as he attempts to defuse it. Sebastian Milton, Pamela's arrogant son, murders Rick and is imprisoned for life. Decades later, society has been restored, and the major portion of the apocalypse, now known as "The Trials", has ended. Walkers are still around, but are few in number. Carl lives a simple countryside life with his wife Sophia and daughter Andrea, to whom he tells the story of his father. A large statue of Rick stands in front of the courthouse in Commonwealth One, located in Ohio.

== Specials ==
Michonne Special (March 16, 2012)

A story featuring Michonne in the early days of the outbreak, that also reveals the identity of her two "pet walkers".

The Governor Special (February 13, 2013)

A story featuring The Governor in his early days as the leader of Woodbury, as well as the fate of Scott Moon.

Free Comic Book Day Special (May 4, 2013)

A collection of Morgan's, Michonne's, The Governor's, and Tyreese's specials.

Morgan Special (May 5, 2013)

A short story consisting of six pages, featuring Morgan during the winter of the apocalypse (and during the events of the second volume).

Tyreese Special (October 9, 2013)

The story of Tyreese, along with his daughter, Julie, and her boyfriend, Chris, in the early days of the outbreak.

The Walking Dead: The Alien (April 20, 2016)

The Walking Dead: The Alien is a brief story consisting of 32 pages, featuring Rick Grimes' brother, Jeffrey Grimes, as he deals with the outbreak in Barcelona, Spain.

The Walking Dead: Here's Negan! (April 27, 2016 – July 26, 2017, October 4, 2017 (Hardcover))

The Walking Dead: Here's Negan! is a stand-alone volume of Image Comics' The Walking Dead, featuring the backstory of Negan. The story was initially serialized in four-page installments within the first sixteen issues of Image's monthly in-house magazine, Image+, published from April 2016 to July 2017. In November 2017, the story was collected and published as a 72-page hardcover volume.

Negan Lives! (July 1, 2020)

Negan Lives is a one-shot story of Image Comics' The Walking Dead consisting of 36 pages, featuring Negan and following the character after Issue #174.

Rick Grimes 2000 (July 7, 2021 - August 4, 2021)

Rick Grimes 2000 is a five-chapter non-canonical comic series that serves as a follow-up to a joke alternate ending from issue #75, in which Grimes, after being knocked out by Michonne in the main story, abruptly awakens in a science fiction scenario, with the zombie infestation being explained as the precursor of an alien invasion.

Clementine Lives! (July 7, 2021)

Clementine Lives! is a 12-page one-shot comic that serves as a bridge between The Walking Dead Telltale video game series and the subsequent Clementine graphic novels.

Clementine (June 22, 2022 – June 25, 2025)

Clementine is a trilogy of graphic novels, consisting of Clementine: Book One, Book Two, and Book Three. The story follows Clementine, set sometime after the events of the fourth Telltale game, where she begins a new journey for a fulfilling purpose.

== List of characters ==
Rick Grimes is the protagonist and a former police deputy. The story begins when he wakes up from his comatose state in a hospital. Though he is initially separated from the two, Rick soon joins his wife Lori and his son Carl and their new group of survivors. Among the survivors are his former best friend Shane (who secretly has a sexual relationship with Rick's wife, Lori), firm clerk and college graduate Andrea, her sister Amy, a mechanic named Jim, a pizza delivery boy named Glenn, car salesman Dale, shoe salesman Allen and his wife, Donna, as well as their children, Ben and Billy. Lori and Carl form friendships with other survivors such as Carol and Sophia.

After leaving the camp, Rick gains a right-hand man and forms a close friendship with Tyreese, a man accompanied by his daughter and her boyfriend. They soon find a farm run by Hershel Greene, after one of his hunters, Otis, accidentally shot Carl while hunting a deer. Among Hershel's seven children is Maggie Greene, who forms a relationship with Glenn. As the group settle at a prison, they become conflicted with a group of surviving prisoners. Otis meets a katana-wielding survivor named Michonne, who is brought into the group, but struggles to acclimate, facing her own demons. Michonne, Rick and Glenn are later held in captivity by The Governor, a leader of a town called Woodbury who plan to take over the prison. Other Woodbury residents include Alice Warren, who changes sides to Rick's group and delivers Lori's baby, Bob Stookey, an army medic responsible for saving The Governor's life and Lilly, one of The Governor's soldiers.

After the prison assault, the remaining survivors regroup at Hershel's farm, and meet Abraham Ford, Eugene Porter and Rosita Espinosa. The group travel to Washington, D.C. where they are hunted by Chris, encounter Gabriel Stokes, a priest, and are then recruited by Aaron and Eric to join the Alexandria Safe-Zone, a city run by congressman Douglas Monroe. Among the residents are Heath and Dr. Denise Cloyd, who quickly become close allies to the core group, and eventually the conflicted Nicholas. Douglas's son, Spencer tries to form a relationship with Andrea. Rick falls in love with Jessie Anderson, an abused wife. Abraham forms a relationship with Holly, a member of the construction crew.

A group of men, known as The Scavengers, tries to conquer Alexandria; the fight attracts a pack of walkers that invades the safe zone, which led to the death of many Alexandrians. After this, Rick and Andrea form a long-standing relationship.

Later, the safe zone starts a trading network with the Hilltop Colony, with help from its scout Paul "Jesus" Monroe. However, their safety is again threatened by the psychopathic Negan and his group known as The Saviors, who reside in a factory. The Hilltop and Alexandria join with The Kingdom, which is run by King Ezekiel, in a war against the Saviors. The war ends thanks to Dwight, a savior who decided to betray Negan.

After the war, newcomers such as Magna and Dante are introduced into the series. Oceanside, another community out at sea, is established, as well as safety perimeters across the DC area, which are violated by the presence of the Whisperers, a tribe of people disguised as the dead who have rejected the notion of re-establishing civilization. The leader, Alpha, antagonizes Rick as her daughter, Lydia, forms a romantic relationship with Carl. When Alpha's second in command, Beta, takes leadership of the group, he declares war against the communities.

=== The undead/reanimated ===
Rick's group classifies the undead as either walkers, roamers or lurkers, the former being more likely to venture toward a loud noise in search of human prey. Other names have been used by characters in the series, including biters and stinkers. The undead follow and mimic each other, which can result in enormous hordes travelling together, "walking nonstop, following a sound they've all forgotten," as Abraham puts it. When asked about the origins of zombies, Kirkman claimed that there was an answer but that it was unimportant to the story-line. At the same time, it was reported that when Kirkman pitched the series he had claimed that the virus was an alien biological attack in preparation of a full-scale invasion but that he had no intention of following this idea.

== Reception ==
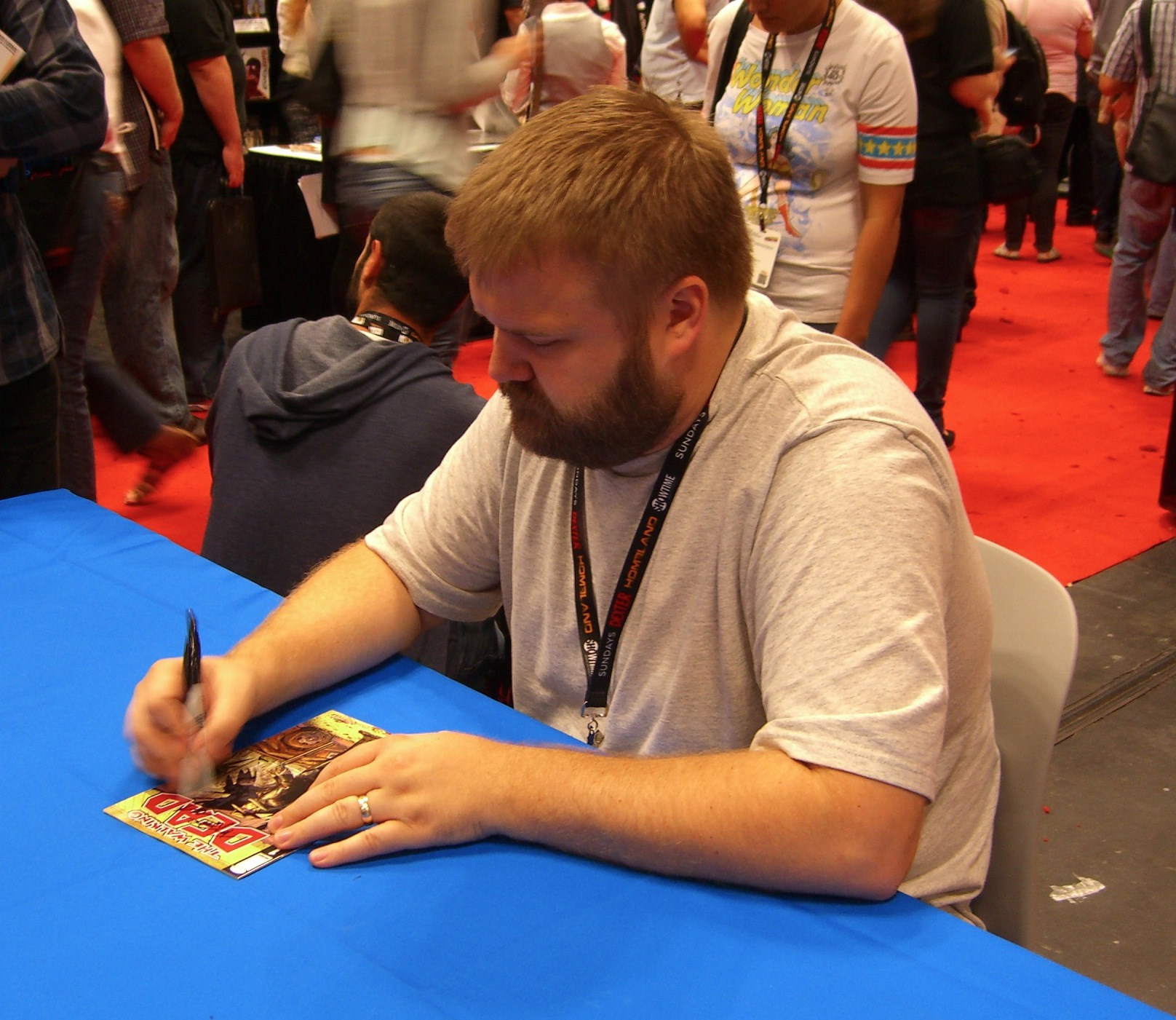
Co-creator Robert Kirkman signing a copy of the first issue at the 2011 New York Comic Con.

The series received critical acclaim, winning the Eisner Award for Best Continuing Series in 2010 and prompting Eric Sunde of IGN comics to call it "one of the best monthly comics available". Among its fans are author Max Brooks. Because of the popularity of the series, which increased considerably when it was adapted into a television series of the same name, artist Tony Moore's original artwork for the series' early issues has gone up in value; on the March 28, 2013 episode of the VH1 reality television series For What It's Worth, Moore's original artwork for Page 7 of issue #1 was professionally appraised to be worth $20,000.

== Other media ==
=== Television adaptation and spin-offs ===
AMC picked up the rights to produce a television series based on the comic in 2009. The first season of the series premiered on October 31, 2010 to high ratings, with later seasons cementing the show as one of the most popular television shows of all time. The series is loosely inspired by the comic, introducing new characters such as Daryl Dixon and deviating from the comic in certain plot points. Such deviations include the departure of Rick Grimes in its ninth season and the death of his son Carl Grimes in its eighth season, despite both characters being present in the entire comic run. The series concluded in 2022 after its eleventh season.

With the premiere of the fourth season in 2013, Scott M. Gimple became the show's third showrunner. Gimple has said that he would stay closer in line to the comic book series events "as much as possible", but ultimately remix stories with certain characters, referencing original characters introduced to the show and deceased characters alive in the comic book as a reason for this. Robert Kirkman commented that he believed the series would be much closer to the comic series under Gimple. With the series' ninth season, which started broadcast in October 2018, Angela Kang was promoted to showrunner with Gimple becoming in charge of all Walking Dead properties at AMC. These included multiple spin-off series, continuing even after the main series concluded. These include Fear the Walking Dead, The Walking Dead: World Beyond, Tales of the Walking Dead, The Walking Dead: Dead City, The Walking Dead: Daryl Dixon, and The Walking Dead: The Ones Who Live. These spin-offs either introduce new characters and settings to the universe or continue plot threads from the original television series, with little connection to the comics.

=== Animation comic ===
AMC released an animated short of the first part of Issue No. 1 of the comic with animation by Juice Films, voice acting by Phil LaMarr and art by Tony Moore.

=== Telltale's The Walking Dead ===
Telltale Games, an adventure game developer, secured the rights with Kirkman to make an episodic video game inspired by The Walking Dead comic book series in 2011. While video games have frequently dealt with the zombie genre, Kirkman said of Telltale's game that "it [focuses] more on characterization and emotion than action". Telltale opted to take a new approach to the typical adventure game, making it so that players would have to make decisions through conversation trees or through quick time events, that would propagate through the episode and as determinants into future ones, as to give more weight to the character-driven nature of their game.

Telltale's game, The Walking Dead, first released in 2012, and followed the characters of Lee Everett, a former teacher convicted of murder, and Clementine, a pre-teen girl left alone at the start of the zombie apocalypse; it contained tie-ins with the comic by brief appearances of Glenn Rhee and Hershel Greene, narratively prior to their first appearances in the comic series. The series was a critical success, with much of the praise for the characterization of Clementine and Lee, and is stated to have caused a resurgence in the waning adventure game market since 2000. Telltale went on to develop a full-fledged series, with three additional seasons, additional downloadable content for the first season, and a spin-off title based on Michonne. In all but this spin-off, choices made by players in earlier games continued to set determinants used in later games as the stories followed Clementine's continued struggles to survive as she grows up in the years that followed.

In the midst of releasing the planned final season of The Walking Dead series during 2018, Telltale Games went into bankruptcy, laying off the bulk of the staff and cancelling all projects, including the last two episodes of The Walking Dead. By this point, Kirkman had established Skybound Entertainment and had been eyeing a gaming division. He took the opportunity to secure the rights of Telltale's The Walking Dead properties, and temporarily hired most of the staff that were working on the game so that the series could be finished as well as to close out Clementine's story, which he felt needed to be done. Additionally, with these rights, Skybound took over future publication of Telltale's series, and published a remastered version of all four seasons and additional content, featuring graphical improvements that Telltale had made ahead of starting the fourth season.

=== The Walking Dead: All Out War ===
In January 2016, the Kings of War creator Mantic Games announced plans to release a tabletop miniature wargame based on The Walking Dead, named The Walking Dead: All Out War. The miniatures game was funded through the popular crowdfunding site Kickstarter. This product is available for order and first began shipping to backers on November 7, 2016.

=== Novels ===
A series of novels based on the comics, written by Robert Kirkman and Jay Bonansinga, were released between 2011 and 2014 focusing on the antagonist "The Governor". Taking place in the initial outbreak, the books chronicle his experiences from surviving in the newly ravaged world to the establishment of himself as leader of Woodbury, and finally tying up the conclusion to the prison arc storyline in the comics.

Following The Walking Dead: The Fall of the Governor, Bonansinga continued the Walking Dead novels as sole author, with Kirkman's name affixed to the title.

Title	ISBN	Release date	Author(s)
The Walking Dead: Rise of the Governor	978-0-312-54773-8	October 11, 2011	Kirkman and Jay Bonansinga
The Walking Dead: The Road to Woodbury	978-0-312-54774-5	October 16, 2012	Kirkman and Jay Bonansinga
A Walking Dead Short: Just Another Day at the Office	978-1-4668-3196-4	December 8, 2012	Kirkman and Jay Bonansinga
The Walking Dead: The Fall of the Governor Part One	978-1-250-02064-2	October 8, 2013	Kirkman and Jay Bonansinga
The Walking Dead: The Fall of the Governor Part Two	978-1-4472-6682-2	March 13, 2014	Kirkman and Jay Bonansinga
Robert Kirkman's The Walking Dead: Descent	978-1-250-05717-4	October 14, 2014	Jay Bonansinga
Robert Kirkman's The Walking Dead: Invasion	978-1-250-05850-8	October 6, 2015	Jay Bonansinga
Robert Kirkman's The Walking Dead: Search and Destroy	978-1-250-05851-5	October 18, 2016	Jay Bonansinga
Robert Kirkman's The Walking Dead: Return to Woodbury	978-1-250-05852-2	October 17, 2017	Jay Bonansinga
Robert Kirkman's The Walking Dead: Typhoon	978-1-5082-9711-6	October 1, 2019	Wesley Chu

== Collected editions ==
The series has so far been assembled into the following collections:

=== Trade paperbacks ===
The trade paperbacks collect story arcs of six issues each, but contain only the story and none of the original cover art from the comics. Each paperback follows the convention of having a three-word title. The zombies in the cover art for each paperback form part of a larger image if placed end to end. This also loops, as the final zombie on Volume 32 connects to the first on Volume 1.

Each story arc is re-released in hardcover books containing two, omnibus editions containing four, and compendiums containing eight story arcs.

Title	Collected material	Release date	ISBN	Issues published	Hardcover Book Number	Omnibus Number	Compendium Number
The Walking Dead Vol. 1: Days Gone Bye	TWD #1–6	May 12, 2004	1-58240-358-9	October 2003 – March 2004	1	1	1
The Walking Dead Vol. 2: Miles Behind Us	TWD #7–12	November 24, 2004	1-58240-413-5	April 2004 – September 2004	1	1	1
The Walking Dead Vol. 3: Safety Behind Bars	TWD #13–18	May 18, 2005	1-58240-487-9	October 2004 – April 2005	2	1	1
The Walking Dead Vol. 4: The Heart's Desire	TWD #19–24	November 30, 2005	1-58240-530-1	June 2005 – November 2005	2	1	1
The Walking Dead Vol. 5: The Best Defense	TWD #25–30	September 27, 2006	1-58240-612-X	January 2006 – August 2006	3	2	1
The Walking Dead Vol. 6: This Sorrowful Life	TWD #31–36	April 11, 2007	1-58240-684-7	September 2006 – March 2007	3	2	1
The Walking Dead Vol. 7: The Calm Before	TWD #37–42	September 26, 2007	1-58240-828-9	April 2007 – September 2007	4	2	1
The Walking Dead Vol. 8: Made to Suffer	TWD #43–48	June 25, 2008	1-58240-883-1	October 2007 – April 2008	4	2	1
The Walking Dead Vol. 9: Here We Remain	TWD #49–54	January 21, 2009	1-60706-022-1	May 2008 – November 2008	5	3	2
The Walking Dead Vol. 10: What We Become	TWD #55–60	August 12, 2009	1-60706-075-2	November 2008 – April 2009	5	3	2
The Walking Dead Vol. 11: Fear the Hunters	TWD #61–66	January 6, 2010	1-60706-122-8	May 2009 – October 2009	6	3	2
The Walking Dead Vol. 12: Life Among Them	TWD #67–72	August 3, 2010	1-60706-254-2	November 2009 – May 2010	6	3	2
The Walking Dead Vol. 13: Too Far Gone	TWD #73–78	November 23, 2010	1-60706-329-8	June 2010 – October 2010	7	4	2
The Walking Dead Vol. 14: No Way Out	TWD #79–84	June 22, 2011	1-60706-392-1	November 2010 – April 2011	7	4	2
The Walking Dead Vol. 15: We Find Ourselves	TWD #85–90	December 27, 2011	1-60706-440-5	May 2011 – October 2011	8	4	2
The Walking Dead Vol. 16: A Larger World	TWD #91–96	June 6, 2012	1-60706-559-2	November 2011 – April 2012	8	4	2
The Walking Dead Vol. 17: Something to Fear	TWD #97–102	November 21, 2012	1-60706-615-7	May 2012 – September 2012	9	5	3
The Walking Dead Vol. 18: What Comes After	TWD #103–108	June 18, 2013	1-60706-687-4	October 2012 – March 2013	9	5	3
The Walking Dead Vol. 19: March to War	TWD #109–114	November 13, 2013	1-60706-818-4	April 2013 – September 2013	10	5	3
The Walking Dead Vol. 20: All Out War – Part One	TWD #115–120	March 11, 2014	1-60706-882-6	October 2013 – January 2014	10	5	3
The Walking Dead Vol. 21: All Out War – Part Two	TWD #121–126	July 29, 2014	1-63215-030-1	February 2014 – April 2014	11	6	3
The Walking Dead Vol. 22: A New Beginning	TWD #127–132	November 5, 2014	1-63215-041-7	May 2014 – October 2014	11	6	3
The Walking Dead Vol. 23: Whispers into Screams	TWD #133–138	May 12, 2015	1-63215-258-4	October 2014 – March 2015	12	6	3
The Walking Dead Vol. 24: Life and Death	TWD #139–144	August 26, 2015	1-63215-402-1	March 2015 – July 2015	12	6	3
The Walking Dead Vol. 25: No Turning Back	TWD #145–150	April 5, 2016	1-63215-659-8	August 2015 – January 2016	13	7	4
The Walking Dead Vol. 26: Call to Arms	TWD #151–156	September 14, 2016	1-63215-917-1	February 2016 – July 2016	13	7	4
The Walking Dead Vol. 27: The Whisperer War	TWD #157–162	March 7, 2017	1-5343-0052-X	August 2016 – January 2017	14	7	4
The Walking Dead Vol. 28: A Certain Doom	TWD #163–168	October 3, 2017	1-5343-0244-1	February 2017 – June 2017	14	7	4
The Walking Dead Vol. 29: Lines We Cross	TWD #169–174	March 13, 2018	1-5343-0497-5	July 2017 – December 2017	15	8	4
The Walking Dead Vol. 30: New World Order	TWD #175–180	September 5, 2018	1-5343-0884-9	January 2018 – June 2018	15	8	4
The Walking Dead Vol. 31: The Rotten Core	TWD #181–186	March 12, 2019	1-5343-1052-5	July 2018 – December 2018	16	8	4
The Walking Dead Vol. 32: Rest in Peace	TWD #187–193	August 13, 2019	1-5343-1241-2	January 2019 – July 2019	16	8	4

=== Hardcovers ===
All hardcovers contain the contents of the comics, including the covers, and in some cases bonus material. The books' trim size is larger than the paperbacks. Each hardcover contains two story arcs from the series. Signed versions of the books are available, each limited to 310 pieces.

Title	Collected material	Release Date	ISBN	Cover Character
The Walking Dead: Book One	TWD #1–12	July 19, 2006	978-1-58240-619-0	Rick
The Walking Dead: Book Two	TWD #13–24	March 7, 2007	978-1-58240-698-5	Michonne
The Walking Dead: Book Three	TWD #25–36	December 19, 2007	978-1-58240-825-5	The Governor
The Walking Dead: Book Four	TWD #37–48	October 29, 2008	978-1-60706-000-0	Lori and Judith
The Walking Dead: Book Five	TWD #49–60	May 5, 2010	978-1-60706-171-7	Abraham
The Walking Dead: Book Six	TWD #61–72	October 26, 2010	978-1-60706-327-8	Carl
The Walking Dead: Book Seven	TWD #73–84	October 18, 2011	978-1-60706-439-8	Rick
The Walking Dead: Book Eight	TWD #85–96	September 26, 2012	978-1-60706-593-7	Andrea
The Walking Dead: Book Nine	TWD #97–108	September 17, 2013	978-1-60706-798-6	Negan
The Walking Dead: Book Ten	TWD #109–120	September 3, 2014	978-1-63215-034-9	Ezekiel
The Walking Dead: Book Eleven	TWD #121–132	February 25, 2015	978-1-63215-271-8	Paul "Jesus" Monroe
The Walking Dead: Book Twelve	TWD #133–144	September 30, 2015	978-1-63215-451-4	Rick
The Walking Dead: Book Thirteen	TWD #145–156	October 5, 2016	978-1-63215-916-8	Alpha
The Walking Dead: Book Fourteen	TWD #157–168	October 11, 2017	978-1-5343-0329-4	Dwight
The Walking Dead: Book Fifteen	TWD #169–180	October 10, 2018	978-1-5343-0850-3	Juanita "Princess" Sanchez
The Walking Dead: Book Sixteen	TWD #181–193	September 10, 2019	978-1-5343-1325-5	Rick

=== Omnibus editions ===
Limited omnibus editions collect roughly 24 issues in a slipcase with several extras. The first volume is autographed by Kirkman and Adlard, with 300 copies printed. Subsequent volumes had print runs of 3000 each, along with deluxe limited editions (signed by Kirkman/Adlard) of 300 copies.

The Walking Dead Volume 1 Deluxe HC

Title	Collected material	Release date	ISBN
The Walking Dead: Volume 1 Deluxe HC	TWD #1–24	December 14, 2005	1-58240-511-5
The Walking Dead: Volume 2 Deluxe HC	TWD #25–48	February 17, 2009	1-60706-029-9
The Walking Dead: Volume 3 Deluxe HC	TWD #49–72	February 2, 2011	1-60706-330-1
The Walking Dead: Volume 4 Deluxe HC	TWD #73–96	December 12, 2012	1-60706-616-5
The Walking Dead: Volume 5 Deluxe HC	TWD #97–120	November 19, 2014	1-63215-042-5
The Walking Dead: Volume 6 Deluxe HC	TWD #121–144	December 2, 2015	1-63215-521-4
The Walking Dead: Volume 7 Deluxe HC	TWD #145–168	November 7, 2017	1-5343-0335-9
The Walking Dead: Volume 8 Deluxe HC	TWD #169–193	November 12, 2019	1-5343-1356-7

=== Compendium editions ===
Softcover compendium editions collect approximately 48 comic issues each. They are also available as limited hardcover editions (Red Foil Version for Compendium 1, Gold Foil Version for Compendium 2, and Gold Foil Version for Compendium 3).

Title	Collected material	Release date	ISBN
The Walking Dead: Compendium One	TWD #1–48	May 6, 2009	978-1-60706-076-5
The Walking Dead: Compendium Two	TWD #49–96	October 3, 2012	978-1-60706-596-8
The Walking Dead: Compendium Three	TWD #97–144	October 13, 2015	978-1-63215-456-9
The Walking Dead: Compendium Four	TWD #145–193	October 8, 2019	978-1-5343-1340-8

=== Box sets ===
Title	Collected material	Release date	ISBN
The Walking Dead 15th Anniversary Box Set	TWD #1–144 (TWD Compendium #1–3), Here's Negan and other stories	October 13, 2018	978-1-5343-1023-0

=== Other publications ===
Several ancillary books and a special edition have also been published:

Title	Description	Release date	ISBN
The Walking Dead Survivors' Guide	A detailed guide to every character featured in the comics as of its publication	November 1, 2011	1-60706-458-8
The Walking Dead 100 Project	One hundred covers sketched by various artists commemorating issue #100	September 25, 2013	1-60706-801-X
The Walking Dead: The Covers – Volume 1	Collection of the cover art for The Walking Dead #1–50	October 6, 2010	1-60706-002-7
The Walking Dead: The Covers – Volume 2	Collection of the cover art for The Walking Dead #51-100	July 9, 2013	1-60706-595-9
The Walking Dead: All Out War Artist's Proof Edition	All Out War parts 1 and 2, The Walking Dead #115–126, with its original pencil artwork; cover art features Rick and Negan	October 1, 2014	1-63215-038-7
The Walking Dead: Cutting-Room Floor	Behind-the-scenes look at Robert Kirkman's original, hand-written plot lines for the early issues of the Walking Dead	January 6, 2015	978-1-60706-520-3
The Walking Dead: Here's Negan	Here's Negan story originally serialized in IMAGE+ magazine	October 10, 2017	978-1-5343-0327-0
The Walking Dead: Alien	Alien story originally serialized on PanelSyndicate.com	August 4, 2020	978-1-5343-1659-1
Rick Grimes 2000	Rick Grimes 2000 story originally serialized in Skybound X	June 7, 2022	978-1-5343-2223-3
Clementine Book One	Original graphic novels based on the character from the Walking Dead games by Telltale Games after the events of The Final Season	June 28, 2022	978-1-5343-2128-1
Clementine Book Two	Original graphic novels based on the character from the Walking Dead games by Telltale Games after the events of The Final Season	October 4, 2023	978-1-5343-2519-7
Clementine Book Three	Original graphic novels based on the character from the Walking Dead games by Telltale Games after the events of The Final Season	June 25, 2025	
