= Dead Air =

Dead Air may refer to:

- Dead air, an unintended interruption in a broadcast during which the carrier signal is unmodulated

== Film and television ==
- Dead Air (2007 film), a Hong Kong horror film
- Dead Air (2009 film), an American science fiction-horror film
- "Dead Air" (CSI: Miami), a 2006 episode
- "Dead Air" (Defiance), a 2015 episode
- "Dead Air" (Forever Knight), a 1992 episode
- "Dead Air" (Psych), a 2013 episode

== Literature ==
- Dead Air (novel), a 2002 novel by Iain Banks
- Dead Air, a 1986 novel by Mike Lupica
- Dead Air, a 1991 novel by Bob Larson

== Music ==
- Dead Air (album), a 1993 album by Heatmiser
- Dead Air, a 2009 album by The Bob & Tom Show
- Dead Air, a 2020 album by Katatonia
- "Dead Air", a 2014 song by Chvrches
- DeadAir Records, American independent record label

== Other uses ==
- "Dead Air" (Doctor Who), a 2010 audiobook
- "Dead Air", a campaign in the game Left 4 Dead

== See also ==
- Dead space (disambiguation)
- Dead Silence (disambiguation)
