= Dead Silence (disambiguation) =

Dead Silence is a 2007 American supernatural horror film.

Dead Silence may also refer to:

- Dead Silence (1997 film), a Canadian-American crime thriller TV film
- Dead Silence (novel), by Stacey Kade, 2022
- Dead Silence (album), by Billy Talent, 2012
  - Dead Silence Tour, by Billy Talent
- "Dead Silence", a song by Mondo Generator from the 2012 album Hell Comes to Your Heart

== See also ==
- Dead air (disambiguation)
- Dead space (disambiguation)
