= Panoramix =

Panoramix may refer to:

- Panoramix, the original French name for the druid character in the Asterix stories, named Getafix in English translations
- PanoramiX, was the original name of the Xinerama extension to the X Window System
- 35268 Panoramix, a minor planet
