= Dead zone =

Dead zone may refer to:

== Science and technology ==
- Dead zone (cell phone), an area where cell phones cannot transmit to a nearby cell site
- Dead zone (ecology), low-oxygen areas in the world's oceans
- Dead band, the region of insensitivity of a system

== Arts and entertainment ==
=== Games ===
- Dead Zone (video game), a video game produced by SunSoft
- Dead zone (video gaming), term for a region of the screen in video gaming
- Deadzone (Skirmish Game), by Mantic Games

=== Literature ===
- The Dead Zone (novel), a novel by Stephen King

=== Film ===
- The Dead Zone (film), a film based on the Stephen King novel starring Christopher Walken
- Dragon Ball Z: Dead Zone, the first of thirteen Dragon Ball Z films
- Whisper of Dead Zone, the translated English title of the 2012 Turkish film Ölü Bölgeden Fısıltılar.

=== Television ===
- The Dead Zone (TV series), a television series based on the Stephen King novel, starring Anthony Michael Hall

=== Sports ===
- Dead zone (gridiron football), a technical term in American and Canadian football

== Other uses ==
- Death zone, high altitudes where the amount of oxygen is insufficient to sustain human life
- Dead zone (military), a blind spot in a fortification's field of fire which is relatively sheltered from defensive fire.

== See also ==
- The Dead Zone (disambiguation)
