= Mantic Games =

Tabletop game company

Mantic Entertainment Ltd
- Company type: Private Limited Company
- Industry: Miniature wargaming
- Founded: 2008, Nottingham, England
- Headquarters: Bulwell, Nottingham, UK
- Key people: Ronnie Renton, Matt Gilbert
- Products: Kings Of War, Deadzone, Firefight
- Website: Mantic Games

Mantic Games is a British miniatures, wargames and board game publisher, based in Bulwell, Nottingham, UK.

== History ==
Mantic Entertainment Ltd (trading as Mantic Games) is a British manufacturer of miniature wargames, based in Nottingham, England. It was founded in 2008 by former Games Workshop Managing Director Ronnie Renton and two other investors, with a range of fantasy miniatures that were compatible with other popular wargames, including Warhammer Fantasy Battles. Mantic began trading in 2009 and is one of numerous miniature and wargaming companies in Nottingham's so-called Lead Belt. In 2015 Mantic relocated to its current headquarters in Bulwell, Nottingham.

Early plastic models made by Mantic were sculpted by Bob Naismith and tooled by production company Renedra in the UK. Other models were all cast in metal in-house. For the first few years, all models were done traditionally by hand-sculpting, but this eventually moved to an all-digital process. Original art direction and some early photography was the responsibility of ex-Games Workshop painter Mike McVey.

It soon began publishing its own board games and miniature games. Notable early titles included Kings of War, Dwarf King's Hold, Dungeon Saga, DreadBall, Deadzone, Project Pandora, Warpath and Loka (published for River Horse Games). It has also produced licensed games such as Mars Attacks, The Walking Dead: All Out War, Hellboy: The Board Game, Worms: The Board Game and most recently Halo: Flashpoint.

Mantic has made use of crowd funding to develop and bring games to market, starting with the first for Kings of War, on the Kickstarter platform in 2012.

Having previously contributed to a number of Mantic products and games, Matt Gilbert joined the company as Chief Operating Officer in 2016.

Mantic started making in-house resin models in 2018 and in 2020 significantly increased production due to the release of its Armada fantasy naval game. Traditional metal model casting has slowly been replaced by resin in the Mantic model catalogue since this date. Only a few metal lines are now cast in-house as of 2024.

By the end of 2021, Ronnie Renton had sole ownership of Mantic.

In 2023 Mantic released the Mantic Companion, a web application for army list building and the current rules for all of its various games. This is supported by various subscription tiers. In addition, Mantic launched the Mantic Vault which offers a monthly subscription to 3D model assets for home 3D printing. In 2025 the Mantic Vault added an online store for one-time purchases of 3D model assets in addition to the subscription service.

In 2024, Mantic acquired the assets of River Horse Games (founded by Alessio Cavatore).

== Game development ==
Mantic has a small internal studio team and makes extensive use of the gaming industry talent in the local Nottingham area and beyond for all its games; from games designers, authors, to artists and sculptors.

Mantic is very community and gamer focused and opens up the maintenance and ongoing development of games through the creation of Rules Committees which are small groups of fans who offer feedback and guidance to the company based on community feedback and opinions. Members of the Rules Committees apply to Mantic and are usually asked to submit a fan written narrative scenario based on the story of the game and to demonstrate their experience with the game. The Rules Committees serve as a bridge between the company and the fan base and members are often seen as representatives for the fans. They often play a large role in developing the rules for further editions of games.

== Awards ==
- At the 2010 Origins Awards, Mantic Games was a finalist for their King of War: Elves line of figurines in the category "Best Miniatures Figure or Line of Figures".
- At the 2012 Origins Awards, Mantic Games was a finalist for their Forge Father Huscarl figurine in the category "Best Miniatures Figure or Line of Figures".
- At the 2013 Origins Awards, Mantic Games was a finalist for their Trontek 29ers Corporation Team line of figurines in the category "Best Miniature Figure Line".
- At the 2018 Origins Awards, Mantic Games was a finalist for their Walking Dead Miniatures Game in the category "Best Miniatures".
- At the 2019 Origins Awards, Mantic Games was a finalist for their Kings of War: Vanguard in the category "Best Miniatures".
- Mantic Games' Firefight was "Best Miniature Wargame Of 2022" in the OnTableTop Industry Awards of 2022.

== List of Mantic games ==
This list shows the main game releases, but does not include any supplements or expansions.

=== Kings of War Universe ===
Kings of War is a mass battle wargame set in Mantic's fantasy universe called Pannithor (originally called Mantica), and the universe includes the following main games:

- Kings of War
- Kings of War Vanguard
- Kings of War Armada
- Kings of War Champions
- Dungeon Saga Origins

Warpath Universe

Warpath is the name of the universe for Mantic's own science fiction games, including:

- Deadzone
- Firefight
- Epic Warpath
- Dreadball

Current games
Name	Version	Genre	Type	Main designer(s)	Other significant contributors	Year published
Kings of War	4	Fantasy	Mass Battle Wargame	Alessio Cavatore, Matt Gilbert	Kings of War Rules Committee	2023
Vanguard	1.5	Fantasy	Skirmish Game	Vanguard Rules Committee	Matt Gilbert	2021
Dungeon Saga Origins	1	Fantasy	Miniatures Board Game	Ciaran Morris, Matt Gilbert	Dungeon Saga Rules Committee	2023
Dungeon Saga Origins The Dice Game	1	Fantasy	Card/Dice Game	Matt Gilbert	Rob Burman	2023
League of Infamy	1	Fantasy	Miniatures Board Game	James Hewitt, Sophie Williams (Needy Cat Games)		2021
Bar Room Brawl	1	Fantasy	Board Game	Matt Gilbert		2023
Armada	1	Fantasy	Naval Battle Game	Matt Gilbert	Gabrio Tolentino (Warlord Games)	2020
Firefight	2.5	Sci-fi	Mass Battle Wargame	Firefight Rules Committee		2023
Deadzone	3	Sci-fi	Skirmish Game	Deadzone Rules Committee		2021
Epic Warpath	1	Sci-Fi	Mass battle wargame	Matt Gilbert and Alessio Cavatore		
Deep-space: Pest Control	1	Sci-fi	Board Game	Matt Gilbert		2024
OverDrive	1	Sci-fi	Board Game	Rob Burman		2021

Out of print games
Name	Version	Genre	Type	Main designer(s)	Other significant contributors	Year published
Kings of War	1	Fantasy	Mass Battle Wargame	Alessio Cavatore		2012
Kings of War	2	Fantasy	Mass Battle Wargame	Alessio Cavatore	Kings of War Rules Committee	2015
Kings of War	3	Fantasy	Mass Battle Wargame	Kings of War Rules Committee	Matt Gilbert	2019
Kings of War Historical	1	Fantasy	Mass Battle Wargame	Kings of War Rules Committee		2016
Vanguard	1	Fantasy	Skirmish Game	Matt Gilbert		2018
Dwarf King's Hold	1	Fantasy	Miniatures Board Game	Jake Thornton		2011
Dungeon Saga	1	Fantasy	Miniatures Board Game	Jake Thornton		2015
Warpath	1	Sci-fi	Mass Battle Wargame	Alessio Cavatore		2011
Warpath	2	Sci-fi	Mass Battle Wargame	Alessio Cavatore	Matt Gilbert, Stewart Gibbs	2012
Warpath	3	Sci-fi	Mass Battle Wargame	Stewart Gibbs	Matt Gilbert	2016
Firefight	1	Sci-fi	Mass Battle Wargame	Matt Hobday		2016
Firefight	2	Sci-fi	Mass Battle Wargame	Andy Sharp	Firefight Rules Committee	2022
Deadzone	1	Sci-fi	Skirmish Game	Jake Thornton		2014
Deadzone	2	Sci-fi	Skirmish Game	Deadzone Rules Committee		2016
DreadBall	1	Sci-fi	Miniatures Board Game	Jake Thornton	James Hewitt	2012
DreadBall	2	Sci-fi	Miniatures Board Game	Stewart Gibbs, DreadBall Rules Committee		2017
DreadBall: Xtreme	1	Sci-fi	Miniatures Board Game	Jake Thornton		2015
Project Pandora	1	Sci-fi	Miniatures Board Game	Jake Thornton		2012
Star Saga	1	Sci-fi	Miniatures Board Game	Stewart Gibbs		2017

== List of Mantic's licensed games ==
This list shows the main releases for titles where Mantic have the rights to produce games, but does not include any supplements or expansions.

Current games
Name	Licensor	Main designer(s)	Other significant contributors	Year published
Hellboy: The Board Game	Dark Horse Comics	James Hewitt, Sophie Williams (Needy Cat Games)		2018
Hellboy: The RPG	Dark Horse Comics	Redscar		2022
Hellboy: The Dice Game	Dark Horse Comics	Matt Gilbert	Rob Burman	2022
Umbrella Academy: The Board Game	Dark Horse Comics	River Horse		2022
Worms: The Board Game	Team17	River Horse/Caesar Inc.		2024
Halo: Flashpoint	343 Industries	Ian Davies		2024
The Walking Dead: All out War	Skybound	Mark Latham	The Walking Dead Rules Committee	2016
The Walking Dead: The Dice Game	Skybound	Matt Gilbert	Rob Burman	2023
Invincible: The Dice Game	Skybound	Matt Gilbert	Rob Burman	2023

Out of print games
Name	Licensor	Main designer(s)	Other contributors	Year published
Mars Attacks	Topps	Jake Thornton	Matt Gilbert	2014

Upcoming games
Year	Licensor	Main designer(s)	Other contributors	Year of release
Labyrinth: The Board Game	Henson	River Horse		2025

== Kickstarter activity ==
Mantic has used Kickstarter to fund a number of its games and expansions, making over $10.5 million to date.

Mantic Games Kickstarter projects
Total USD	Project name	Backers
354,997	Kings of War	1,568
728,985	Dreadball	2,539
104,172	Loka (with Alessio Cavatore)	745
1,216,482	Deadzone	4,306
558,076	Mars Attacks	2,753
575,755	Dreadball Xtreme	2,482
1,057,975	Dungeon Saga	5,963
366,547	Kings of War: Second Edition	2,747
380,554	Deadzone: Infection	2,810
484,917	Warpath	3,355
272,409	Kings of War: Vanguard	2,231
1,823,571	Hellboy: The Board Game	12,716
466,127	Hellboy: The Roleplaying Game	6,071
296,147	TerrainCrate 2: Crate Expectations	2,666
174,728	League of Infamy	1,556
427,654	Hellboy: The Board Game Expansions and Dice Game	4,988
106,343	TerrainCrate 3: Bring The Background To The Foreground	1,046
504,060	Dungeon Saga Origins – The Game of Classic Fantasy Adventure	4,021
673,833	Worms: The Board Game	5,849
227,428	Dreadball All Stars	1,066

== Other products ==
Mantic produces an extensive Terrain Crate range of scenery models for various genres, including RPGs and war games. It has also produced small print runs of RPG adventures and miniature packs using Terrain Crate products under the Dungeon Adventures brand.
