= Dead space =

Dead space or Dead Space may refer to:

== Media ==
- Dead Space, a science fiction horror multimedia franchise
  - Dead Space (2008 video game), a 2008 video game and inaugural title in the franchise
  - Dead Space (2023 video game), a remake of the 2008 game
  - Dead Space (mobile game), a 2011 third-person survival horror mobile game
  - Dead Space (comics), a 2008 prequel comic book series
  - Dead Space: Downfall, a 2008 adult animated horror film based on the video game
- Dead Space (novel), a 2021 science fiction novel
- Dead Space (film), a 1991 science-fiction film
- Dead Space (album), a 1994 album by Slowdown Virginia
- 30 Days of Night: Dead Space, a comic book story

== Region or gaseous environment ==
- Dead space (physiology), air that is inhaled but does not play a role in gas exchange
- Defilade or dead space, a space that cannot be engaged with direct fire in a military conflict
- A space that exists post-operatively in which fluid may accumulate and may require draining, such as with a Jackson-Pratt drain
- An excess space when using non-identical displays in Xinerama
- Mechanical dead space, the space in an external apparatus where both inhalation and exhalation pass through a common path

== Other uses ==
- Dead Space Recording, a recording studio in Lincoln, Nebraska

== See also ==
- Dead zone (disambiguation)
