= The Dead Zone =

The Dead Zone may refer to:

- The Dead Zone (novel), a 1979 novel by Stephen King
- The Dead Zone (film), a 1983 film adaptation of the novel, starring Christopher Walken and directed by David Cronenberg
- Dragon Ball Z: Dead Zone, a 1989 film directed by Daisuke Nishio
- The Dead Zone (TV series), a television series on USA Network that ran from 2002 through 2007, loosely based on the King novel

== See also ==
- Dead zone (disambiguation)
