= Alessio Cavatore =

Italian-British game designer

- Born: February 14, 1972 (age 54); Turin, Italy
- Occupation: Game designer

Alessio Cavatore is a game designer.

== Early life and education ==
Alessio Cavatore was born in Turin, Italy, on February 14, 1972.

== Career ==
In 1995 Cavatore moved to Nottingham (U.K.) to work for Games Workshop. He wrote several supplements for Warhammer Fantasy Battle before heading up the Lord of the Rings Strategy Battle Game. In 2004 Cavatore was made responsible for all rules material published for the company's three main tabletop systems — Warhammer, Warhammer 40,000, and The Lord of the Rings — and, in 2006, he wrote the rules for a new edition of Warhammer.

Working closely with Rick Priestley, Cavatore has been a designer for Games Workshop's tabletop hobby wargames.

Mordheim (1999) was designed by Alessio Cavatore, Tuomas Pirinen and Rick Priestley. Kings of War (2009) was designed by Cavatore.

Alessio Cavatore made a cameo appearance in the film The Return of the King where he appeared as Rohirrim in the Battle of the Pelennor Fields, alongside fellow Games Workshop designers Alan Perry, Michael Perry and Brian Nelson. They appear near the Mumakil as Peregrin Took searches through the battle debris for Meriadoc Brandybuck, and they also feature on the base of the Mûmak miniature from Games Workshop.

In 2010, he founded River Horse to publish his own games and to collaborate as a consultant with many other well-known publishers in the gaming industry.

With River Horse Origins awards winner Alessio Cavatore has designed or co-designed many miniatures wargames and board games – titles like Deus Vult, Shuuro, Loka, Waterloo - Quelle Affaire!, Terminator Genisys, etc.; not to mention a plethora of expansions and other type of supplements and support material for these systems.

He is the lead game designer for Para Bellum Games' Conquest: The Last Argument of Kings and Conquest: First Blood.

== Works ==
=== Games Workshop ===
- Warmaster (with Rick Priestley and Stephan Hess)
- The Lord of the Rings Strategy Battle Game (with Rick Priestley)

Mantic Games

- Kings of War
- Warpath (1st Edition)
- Epic Warpath

=== Warlord Games ===
- Bolt Action (With Rick Priestley)

=== River Horse ===
- Shuuro
- Loka
- The Tarot of Loka
- Waterloo - Quelle Affaire
- Terminator Genisys: The Miniatures Game
- Jim Henson's Labyrinth: The Board Game
- My Little Pony Tails of Equestria: The Storytelling Game
