= Whispers of Dead Zone =

2012 film

- Original film poster
- Directed by: Fırat Çağrı Beyaz
- Written by: Metin Gönen, Fırat Çağrı Beyaz
- Produced by: Recep Süleyman Önüt, Metin Gönen
- Starring: Mete Pere, Leman Özdogan, and Sevcan Çerkez
- Cinematography: Ahmet Gençünal
- Edited by: Fırat Çağrı Beyaz, Taner Sarf
- Music by: Konstantinos Kittou
- Production companies: ParadoksFilm, Kans Film
- Release date: April 12, 2012 (Istanbul Film Festival)
- Running time: 86 minutes
- Country: Turkey
- Language: Turkish
- Budget: ₺400,000

Whispers of Dead Zone (Turkmen: Ölü Bölgeden Fısıltılar) is a 2012 drama in Turkish-French co-production, directed by Fırat Çağrı Beyaz. The film premiered at the Istanbul International Film Festival.

== Synopsis ==
Mete (Mete Pere) is a successful young television director from Northern Cyprus that has settled down in Istanbul, yet doesn't quite feel like he belongs there. He returns to his homeland of Cyprus with the intent to make a documentary. While on the island, Mete feels the division between the Greek and Turkish cultures that exist within him, especially while visiting the graves of his ex-girlfriend, mother, and old friends. He also slowly begins to build a relationship with Rüyam (Leman Özdogan), a beautiful woman that he meets on the island while taking photographs. Their meeting forces him to choose between leaving the island and his homeland or looking beyond his problems with where he belongs and the disintegration of his being.

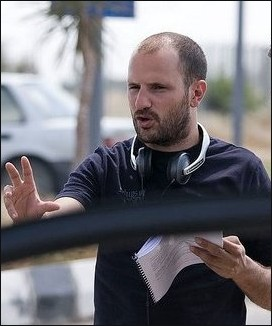

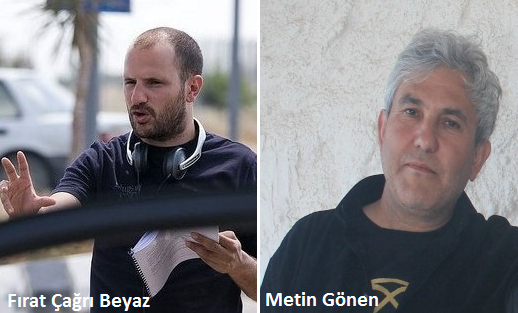

== Cast ==
- Mete Pere as Mete
- Leman Özdogan as Rüyam
- Sevcan Çerkez as Nurdan
- Toprak Altay
- Cenk Gürcağ
- Haluk Ramon Serhun
- Sahir Cacci
- Başak Ekenoğlu
- Kıvanç Giritli
- Şerife Akman
- Emre Yazgın

== Development ==
Beyaz stated that he chose the film's name because he symbolically viewed Cyprus as "a dead country, a dead piece of land". The development of the screenplay took him a year, while partial sponsorship for shooting came from the city of Girne and Karpaz district. After completion the film was backed by the Ministry of Culture and Tourism, helping its promotion in international festivals.

Filming began in March 2011 in the Kyrenia and Karpaz districts, and was Beyaz's directing debut.

The film has already been sold for television broadcast and online streaming.

== Festivals ==
Ölü Bölgeden Fısıltılar has been picked as an official selection at the following film festivals:

- 2012 International Istanbul Film Festival
- 2012 Izmir International Film Festival
- 2012 Sinemardin Mardin International Film Festival
- 2012 Amed International Film Festival
