= Deadzone (wargame) =

Tabletop wargame

- Manufacturers: Mantic Games
- Publishers: Mantic Games
- Years active: 2012 - present
- Players: 2+
- Chance: Dice rolling
- Age range: 11+
- Skills: Tactical, arithmetic, strategic
- Website: http://www.manticgames.com/

Deadzone is a 28 to 32 mm scale science-fiction skirmish tabletop wargame created by Mantic Games.

== Background ==
Deadzone began as a Kickstarter project in 2012, and is currently in its 3rd edition. The 1st edition was designed by Guy Haley and Jake Thornton, and began shipping to backers in November 2013. The 2nd edition was launched in 2016, and the 3rd edition of the game was released in September 2021.

The game is set in Mantic Game's fictional Warpath universe, in which mankind has spread across the galaxy and established hegemony among the stars. The eponymous "dead zones" in the game's title refers to worlds abandoned, quarantined, blockaded or otherwise prohibited by the galaxy's ruling council. The players assume the role of one of ten possible factions fighting over the ruins of these dead zones for plunder, research or whatever suitably plausible narrative explanation befitting their faction's background. While the 1st edition was framed primarily in the galactic council's efforts to quarantine a mysterious alien plague, the increase in the number of factions and their accompanying background has meant an expansion in the possible locales and settings for these skirmish encounters.

== Game Mechanics ==
The game is played on 2' x 2' 3D battlefield subdivided into 3" by 3" "cubes". Unlike most other table top skirmish games, Deadzone foregoes tape measures and uses the cubes to measure movement both on the vertical and horizontal axes. The game uses a combination of eight sided dice for combat, and six sided dice for special command orders which allow players to carry out extra actions or activate special abilities unique to their leader's faction. The players take turns activating one model at a time until all models have been activated. This constitutes one round of play, and games last for five rounds. Teams are selected according to pre-determined points values, with a 100-point team (known as a Strike Team) typically consisting of anything between 5 and 15 models.

== Armies ==
There are a number of playable armies for Deadzone. There are currently ten different factions as of March 2022.

The following factions are currently represented by the official army lists:

- Asterians
- Enforcers
- Forge Fathers
- GCPS
- Plague
- Marauders
- Mazon Labs
- Nameless
- Rebs
- Veer-Myn

== Game and Expansions ==
1st Edition

The 1st edition of Deadzone was the product of a successful Kickstarter campaign by Mantic Games in 2012. It started shipping in November 2013. The starter set contained miniatures, hard plastic scenery, rulebooks, dice, faction decks, tokens and a 2 foot by 2 foot neoprene play mat. The starting factions included in the starter set were the Enforcers and the Plague. Mantic would use the Kickstarter forum to raise money for future Deadzone expansions, all of which were successfully funded.

1st edition expansions:

- the Incursion expansion included rules for the Forge Fathers and the Asterians, as well as rules for multiplayer games;
- the Contagion expansion included rules for Plague Zombies and rules for single player games.

2nd Edition

The 2nd edition of Deadzone was released in 2016. Several changes were implemented in the 2nd edition, with the object being, according to designer Jake Thornton, to make the game "faster, bloodier and easier to learn." The Plague were replaced by the Forge Fathers as the starter faction included in the starter set, although the Enforcers remained as the other starter faction. The neoprene mat was replaced by a paper mat, and a neoprene version of the play map would be sold separately as a game accessory. The faction decks from the 1st edition were removed in favor of command dice, and the tokens were given a graphic overhaul and became smaller in size.

2nd edition expansions:

- the Nexus Psi expansion included a new campaign for the Plague and solo play options;
- the Infestation expansion added the Veer-myn faction, as well as new rules for force organization and an improved campaign mode;
- the Deadzone: Outbreak (2018) supplement introduced the Nameless as another faction;
- the Containment Protocols: Escalation supplement consolidated and codified rules errata accumulated over the lifetime of the game to date, as well introducing modified lists with adjusted points costs for factions which were considered to be underperforming in competitive tournaments. It also introduced the GCPS, and Mazon Labs as additional factions.

3rd Edition

The 3rd edition of the game became available in September 2021. As with the 1st and 2nd editions, the starter set comes with miniatures, scenery, rulebooks, dice, tokens and a 2 foot by 2 foot paper play mat. The starting factions included in the starter set are the GCPS and the Veer-Myn. The play mat has been given a graphical overhaul to represent a more "cyberpunk" or lived in setting, adding a little more color to the gray palette of the 1st and 2nd editions. Similarly the scenery pieces, while recycling several elements from past editions, were enhanced by components which contributed to the new "cyberpunk" or "space frontier settlement" visual theme. The gameplay was not radically altered, with the biggest change being the rules pertaining to line of sight. The 1st and 2nd editions of Deadzone used a true line of sight system which stated that if a model could see another model it could shoot it. This disadvantaged larger models, or models with big dynamic poses which made parts of their body protrude and give them a large visual footprint compared to models with more conservative poses. Another problem with true line of sight was that the clear shot rule in Deadzone, which confers an advantage to a shooter if it could see the whole of the enemy model, could be circumvented by tucking away an inconsequential part of the model (like a tail or a protruding weapon) out of sight behind a piece of scenery. The player could then claim that the whole of the model could not be seen and therefore deny the shooter a clear shot.

In the 3rd edition this problem is addressed by using true line of sight, but with a small abstraction. The visual field which allowed one model to shoot another would now be limited to a cylindrical space extending from the model's base to its head, thus allowing models with large, dynamic poses to remain viable on the battlefield without disadvantage. Similarly a clear shot could no longer be denied by hiding protruding parts of the model behind scenery. For targeting purposes all models in Deadzone are now cylinders, regardless of the pose and size of the model.

== Critical reception ==
Deadzone has had a positive reception overall, with the 1st edition, 2nd edition and 3rd edition scoring 7.4, 8.2 and 9 out of 10 respectively on the board game review site BoardGameGeek as of March 2022.

The 3rd edition of Deadzone has garnered positive reviews from across the Internet, with most reviewers citing its simple ruleset, fast gameplay and ease of access as its most outstanding features. PlayerElimination.com states that the game compares favorably with other top tier skirmish games such as Gaslands, Marvel Crisis Protocol and X-Wing, calling the game "Mantic's best kept secret." TechRaptor.net states the game "has a very tight, beginner-friendly ruleset." WarGamer.com concurs, saying "it feeds into the ease of access that is at the heart of Deadzone. It is a joy to pick up, and will have you running around the narrow alleys and the dilapidated industrial buildings of the future in no time." BigComicPage.com writes, "DZ is a fantastic, murderous, accessible skirmish game with real tactical depth and extraordinary playability" while Nerdly.co declares the game "is parsecs ahead of 40K or Kill Team."

== Derivative Games ==
To date, Mantic have produced four games within their Sci-Fi setting - Deadzone, WarPath (Wargame), Project Pandora: Grim Cargo (out of print) and Dreadball / Dreadball Xtreme. These games do not share the same rules or game mechanics, but they do utilize the same range of character races. Warpath, Project Pandora and Deadzone also share miniatures. Another spin-off game, Halo: Flashpoint, set in the Halo universe, is set for release in November, 2024, and is an evolution of the Deadzone ruleset.
