= Kings of War =

Tabletop wargame by Mantic Games

- 2013 Edition Kings of War Rulebook Cover
- Manufacturers: Mantic Games
- Publishers: Mantic Games
- Years active: 2010 - present
- Players: 2+
- Chance: Dice rolling
- Age range: 11+
- Skills: Tactical, arithmetic, strategic
- Website: http://www.manticgames.com/

Kings of War, (often abbreviated to KoW) is a tabletop wargame created by Mantic Games.

The game has been designed for armies of fantasy miniatures. It uses stock fantasy races such as Elves, Dwarves, Undead and Orcs, as well as demonic version of Dwarfs known as Abyssal Dwarfs. Each race has an alignment (good, evil or neutral) and races of the same or compatible alignments can join forces, allowing the player to have a mixed army.

Initially released as a range of miniatures without a set of companion rules, Mantic Games announced in July 2010 that a set of rules was under development. The game was designed by Alessio Cavatore, who previously worked on the rules for The Lord of the Rings Strategy Battle Game, Warmaster, Warhammer 40,000 and Mordheim while working for Games Workshop.

The game was first announced in early 2010 as a closed beta. The 2010 edition of the game was released in September 2010 with the Mhorgoth's Revenge starter set. The rules were finally published as a download from Mantic's website in December 2010. The 2nd edition of the Kings of War rule book was released in the summer of 2015 and features a cleaned up set of rules, new units in every army and new armies. In October 2019, in celebration of the 10 year anniversary of Kings of War, Mantic released the 380-page 3rd edition rule book. Now in December 2024 4th Edition Kings of War has been launched with the first supplement book Invasion along with the new Xerkaali army.

== Armies ==
There are a number of playable armies for Kings of War, represented by official army-lists as well as several fan-created lists, which are not considered canonical to the game.

2nd edition rulebook contains official army lists for 11 "core" armies. They are Forces of the Abyss, Forces of Nature, Undead, Dwarfs, Elves, Abyssal Dwarfs, Goblins, Orcs, Ogres, Basileans and the Kingdoms of Men

In addition, Mantic games provides army lists for other armies in a book called Kings of War: Uncharted Empires. The smaller armies are The League of Rhordia, Ratkin, The Brotherhood, The Empire of Dust, Salamanders, The Herd, The Trident Realm of Neritica, Night-stalkers and The Varangur.

Armies are divided into 3 factions by alignment: Good, Neutral and Evil. Good and Evil armies cannot be mixed in the same army.

=== Good ===
- Basilea
- Dwarfs
- Free Dwarfs
- Elves
- Northern Alliance
- Order of the Brothermark
- Salamanders

=== Neutral ===
- Kingdoms of Men
- Ogres
- The Forces of Nature
- The Herd
- The League of Rhordia
- The Trident Realm of Neritica
- Sylvan Kin (Wood Elves)
- Order of the Green Lady (Questing Knights devoted to Nature)

=== Evil ===
- Forces of the Abyss
- Abyssal Dwarfs
- Goblins
- Orcs
- Undead
- Twilight Kin
- The Empire of Dust
- Ratkin
- Ratkin Slaves
- Varangur
- Night-stalkers

== Derivative games ==
Mantic Games also released a series of dungeon skirmish games called Dwarf King's Hold which evolved into (and was replaced by) the dungeon-crawl game series Dungeon Saga, the initial game of which having the subtitle The Dwarf King's Quest. They do not share the same rules or game mechanics with Kings of War, but they use the same range of miniatures and are set in the same fictional world of Pannithor.

Also set in the same world is Kings of War Vanguard. This uses the same miniatures as Kings of War and Dungeon Saga, as well as some newly commissioned box sets, but has its own rulebook. It is a skirmish game where players control individual models rather than units, with an experience and level up system for its campaign mode. It was released in 2018.

In 2020 Kings of War Armada was released bringing naval warfare to the seas of Pannithor. The rules are based on Warlord Games popular Black Seas game system.
