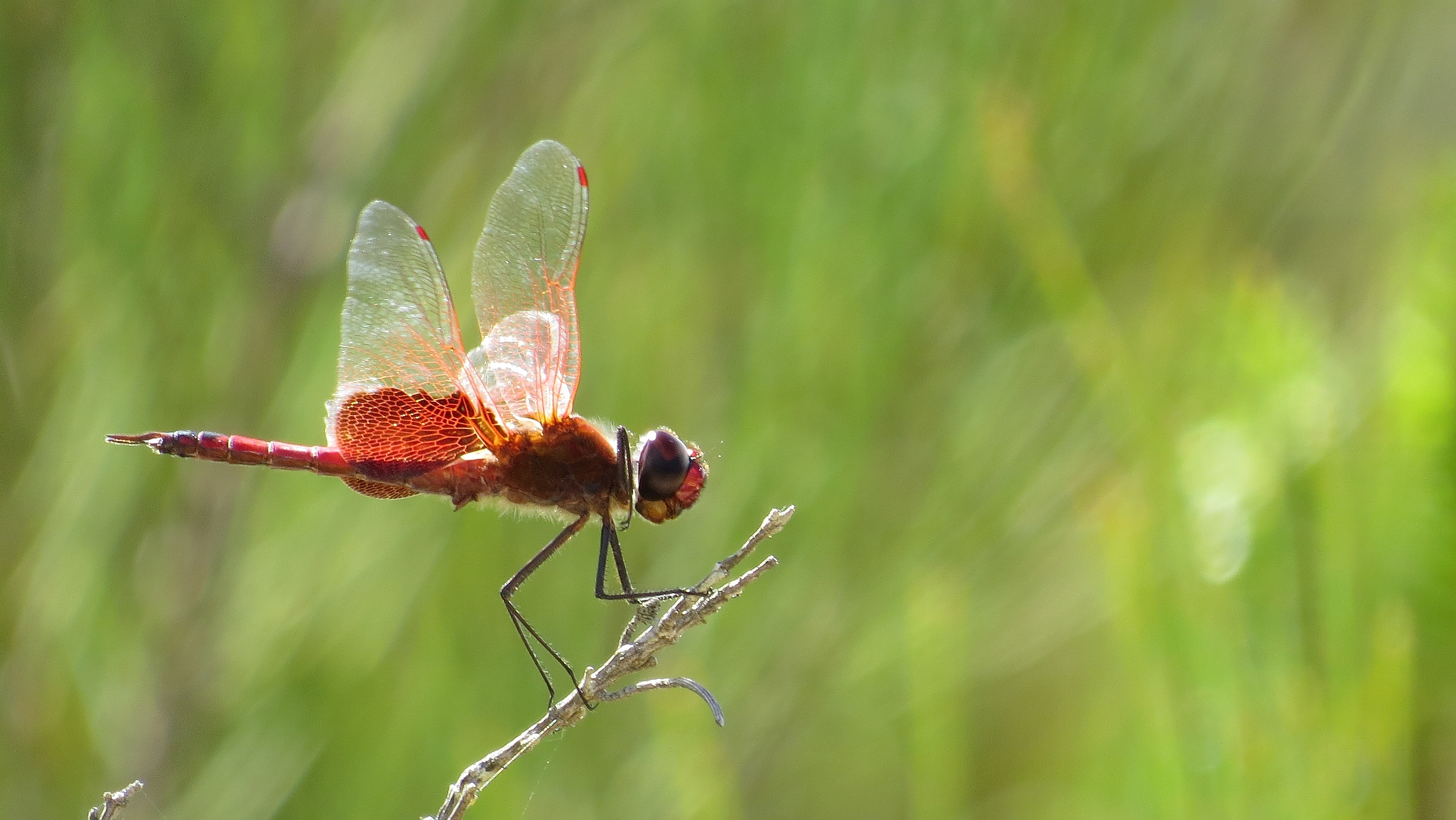
- Male

Conservation status
- Least Concern (IUCN 3.1)

Scientific classification
- Kingdom: Animalia
- Phylum: Arthropoda
- Clade: Pancrustacea
- Class: Insecta
- Order: Odonata
- Infraorder: Anisoptera
- Family: Libellulidae
- Genus: Tramea
- Species: T. eurybia

Binomial name
- Tramea eurybia Selys, 1878

Synonyms
- Tramea biroi Förster, 1898; Tramea loewii petaurina Förster, 1909; Tramea monticola Lieftinck, 1942

= Tramea eurybia =

Dune glider

Species of dragonfly

Tramea eurybia, commonly known as the dune glider, is a species of dragonfly in the family Libellulidae. It occurs from Southeast Asia through New Guinea to Fiji, and in Australia is found mainly at coastal dune lakes in eastern Australia.

It is a medium-sized dragonfly with red, brown and black markings and a distinctive dark patch at the base of the hindwing.

== Taxonomic history ==
In 1878, Selys described Tramea eurybia from specimens collected in Sulawesi.

In 1967, Watson reviewed Indo-Australian species of the Tramea eurybia group, examining the relationships between Tramea eurybia and related species including Tramea stenoloba. Watson recognised Tramea eurybia as a widespread species occurring from the Andaman Islands through the Indonesian archipelago and New Guinea to Australia and Fiji.

== Description ==
Tramea eurybia is a medium-sized dragonfly with red, brown and black markings and a distinctive dark patch at the base of the hindwing.

It is similar in appearance to Tramea stenoloba, but differs in the structure of the reproductive appendages of the male and the vulvar scale, a structure beneath the abdomen of the female.

The thorax is reddish-brown to red, with limited dark markings. In males, the front of the head is orange-red to deep red, with a narrow metallic band along the rear margin. The dark patch at the base of the hindwing is usually large and lacks the surrounding pale border seen in some related species.

== Distribution and habitat ==
Tramea eurybia occurs from the Andaman Islands through the Indonesian archipelago and New Guinea to Fiji.

In Australia it is found mainly at coastal dune lakes in eastern Australia.

Outside Australia the species inhabits a wider range of still-water habitats.

== Etymology ==
The genus name Tramea is derived from the Latin trameare ("to pass through" or "travel across"), referring to the migratory or vagrant behaviour of species in the genus.

The former genus name Trapezostigma is derived from the Greek τραπέζιον (trapezion, "trapezium") and στίγμα (stigma, "spot" or "mark"), likely referring to the shape of the pterostigma.

The species name eurybia is derived from Εὐρυβία (Eurybia), a minor sea goddess in Greek mythology.

== Gallery ==
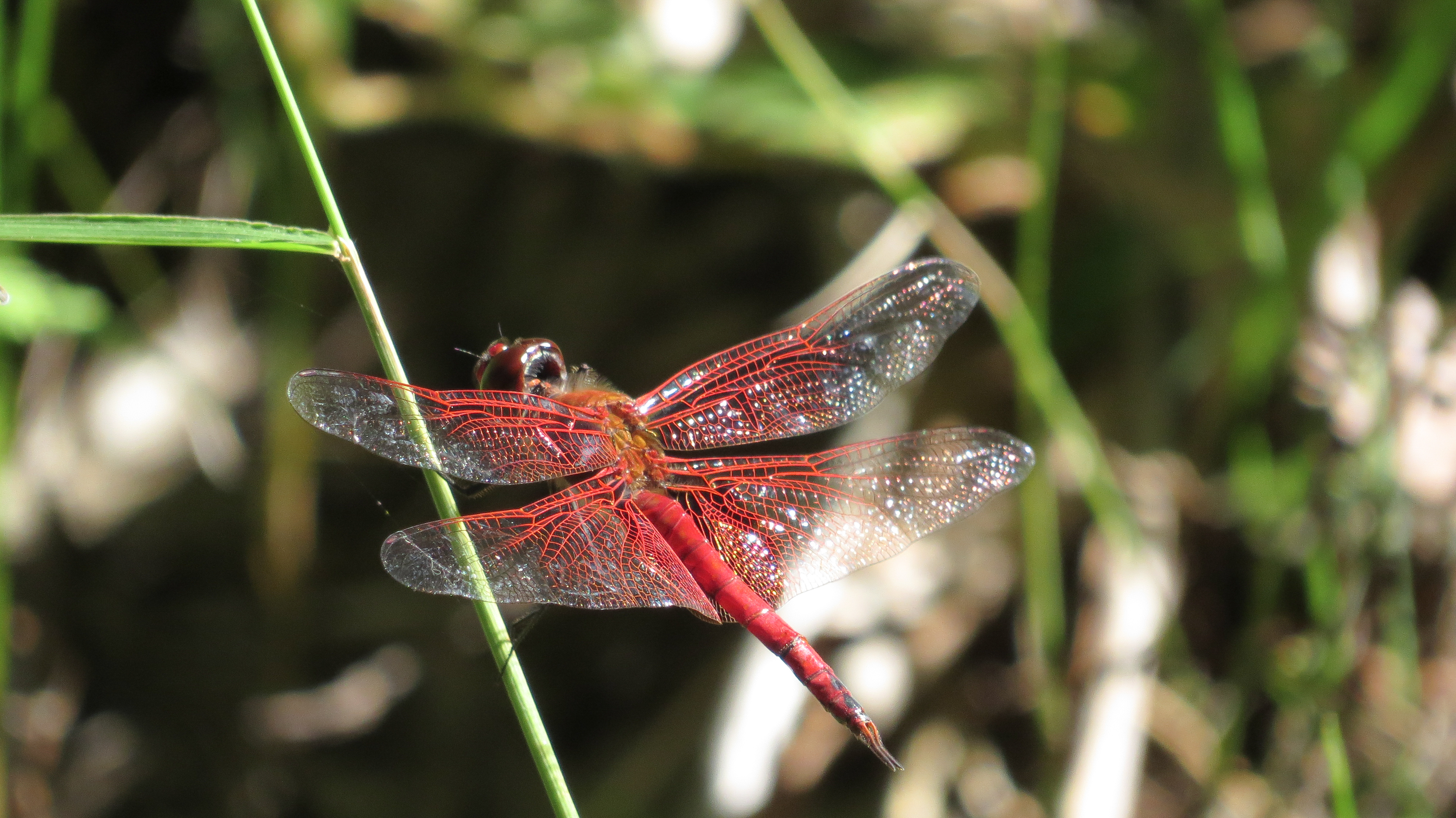
Bright red wing venation in male

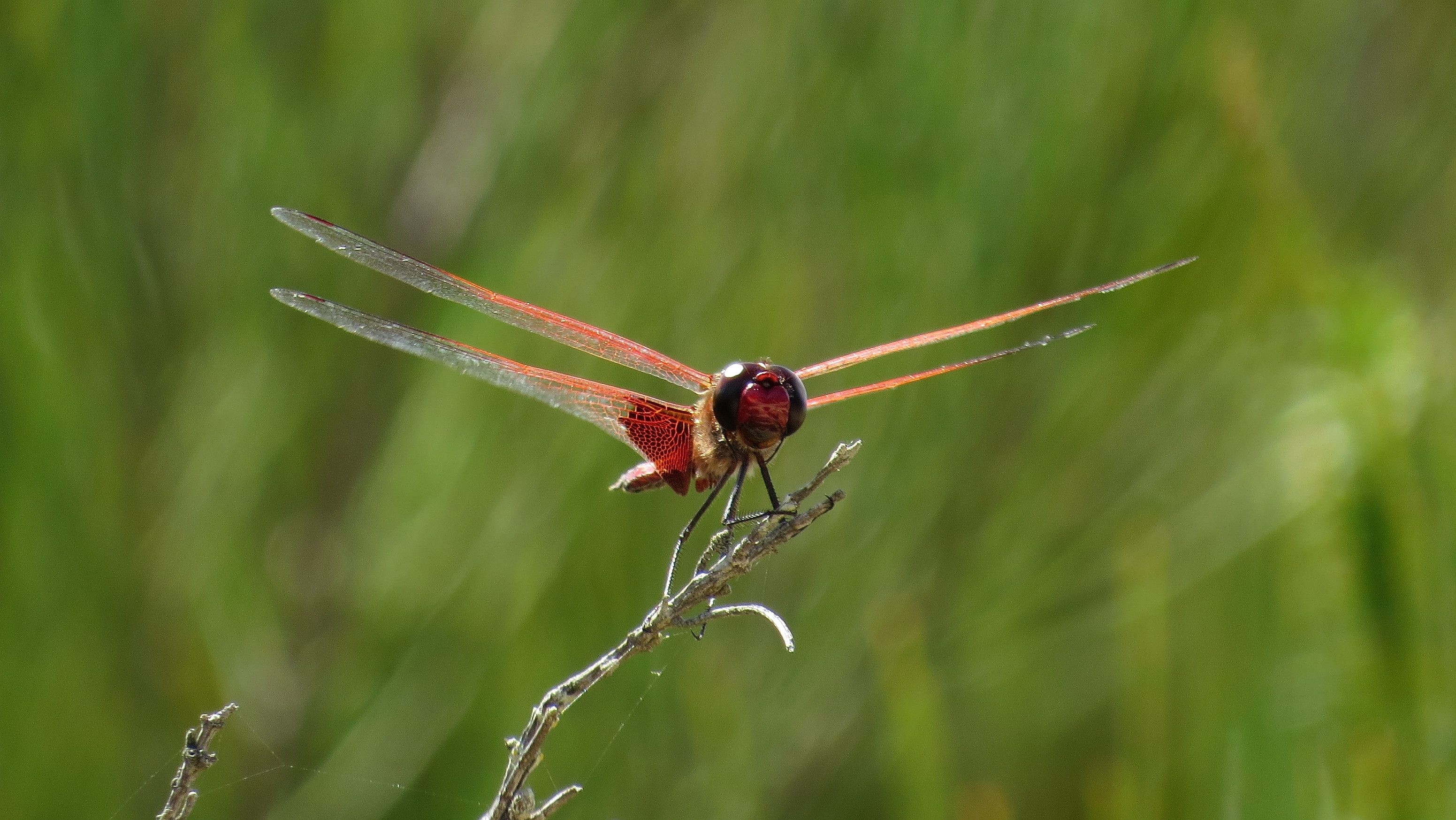
Male face

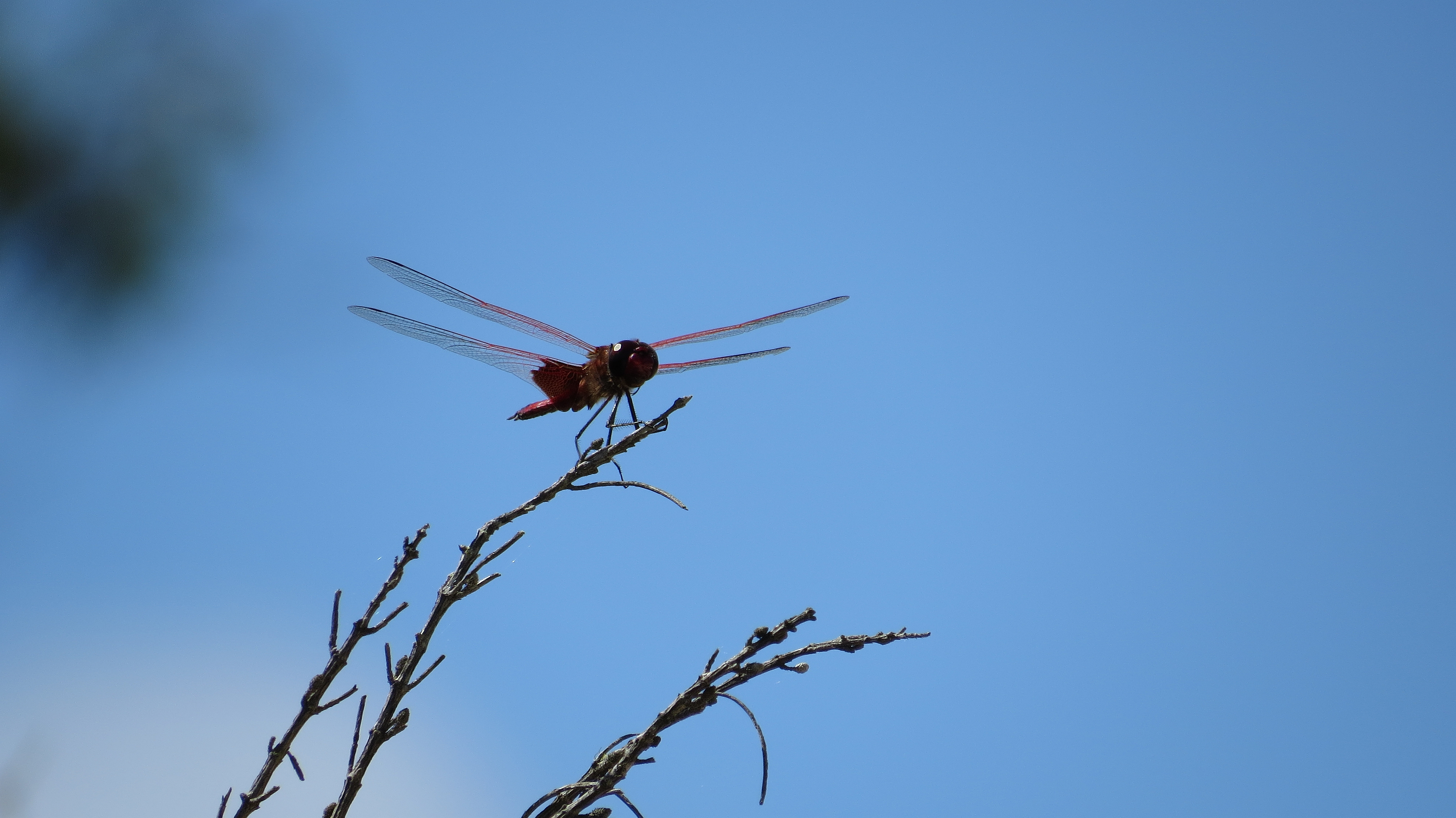
Male

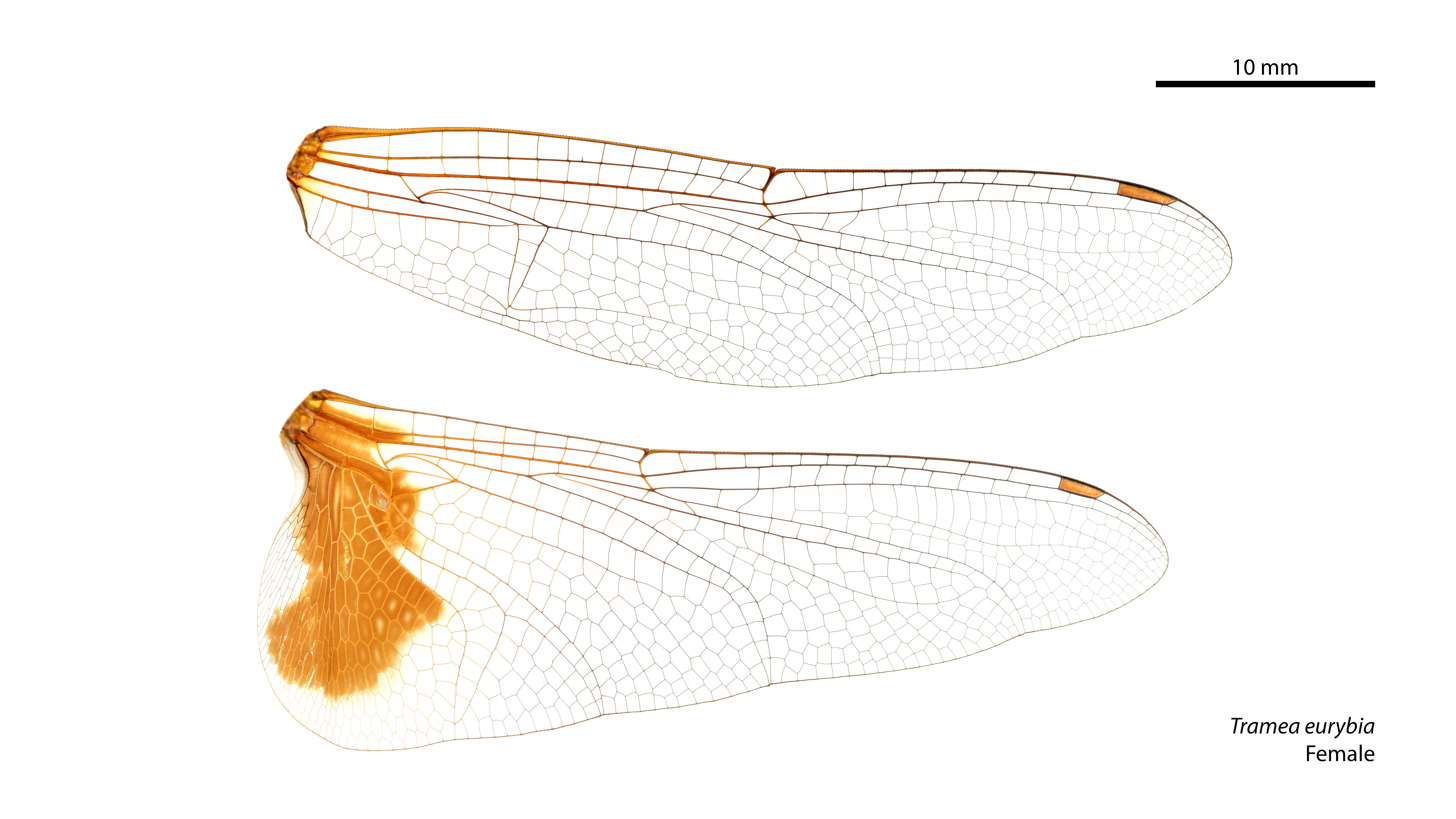
Female wings

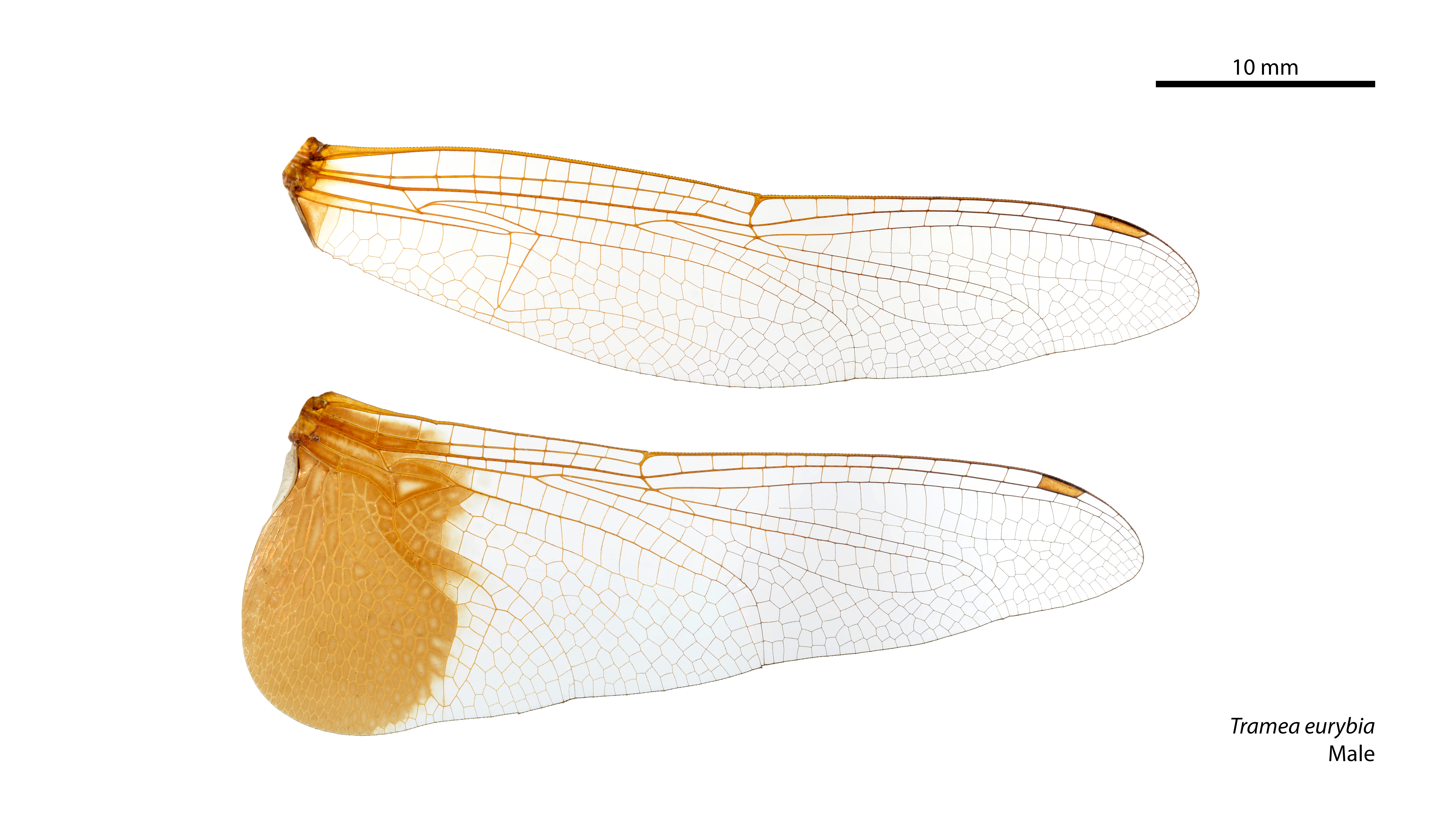
Male wings

== See also ==
- List of Odonata species of Australia
- List of Odonata species of India
