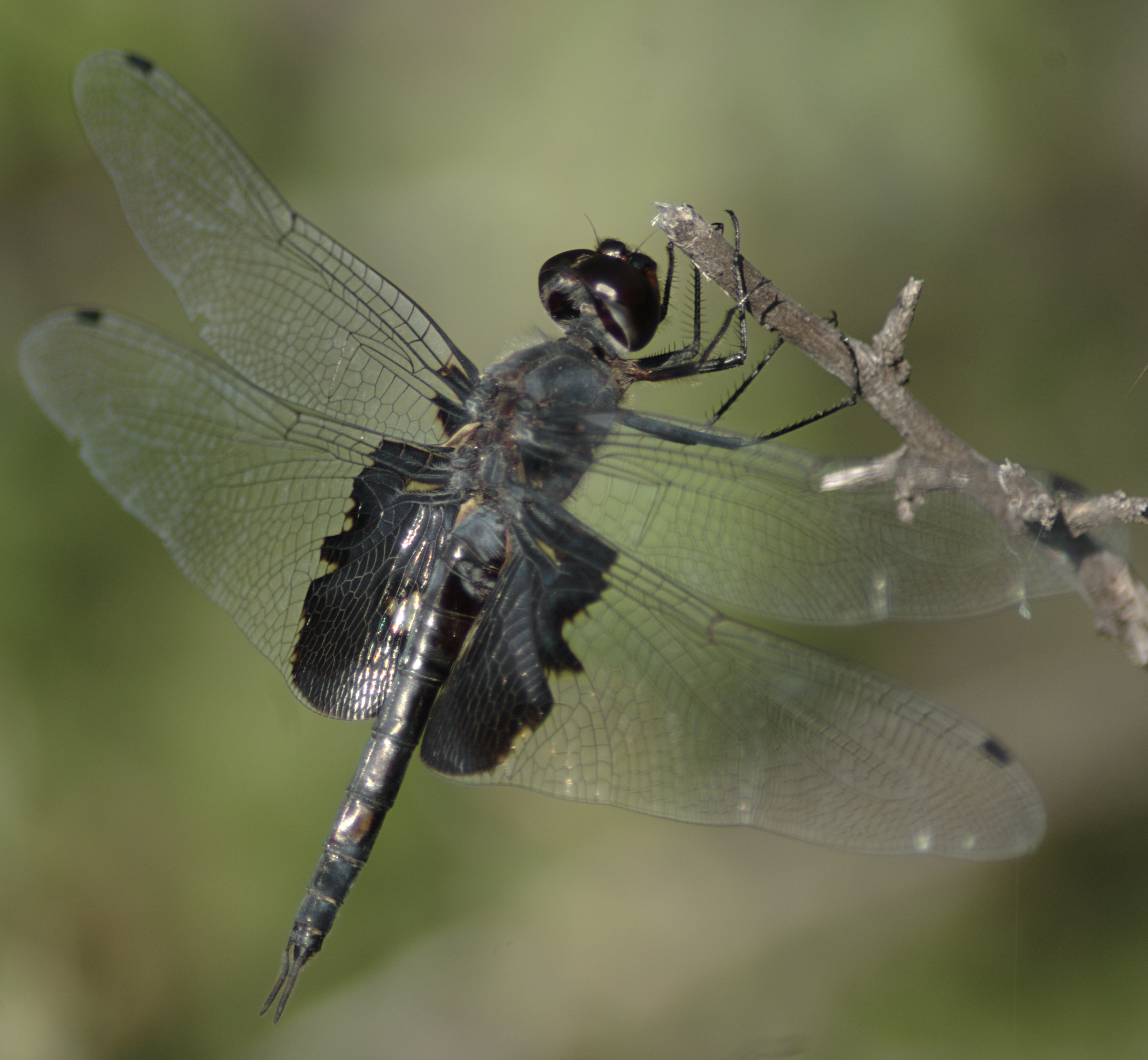

Conservation status
- Least Concern (IUCN 3.1)

Scientific classification
- Kingdom: Animalia
- Phylum: Arthropoda
- Clade: Pancrustacea
- Class: Insecta
- Order: Odonata
- Infraorder: Anisoptera
- Superfamily: Libelluloidea
- Family: Libellulidae
- Genus: Tramea
- Species: T. lacerata

Binomial name
- Tramea lacerata Hagen, 1861

= Black saddlebags =

Species of dragonfly

The black saddlebags (Tramea lacerata) is a species of skimmer dragonfly found throughout North America. It has distinctive wings with characteristic black blotches at their proximal ends, which make the dragonfly look as though it is wearing saddlebags.

The black saddlebags is a relatively large dragonfly at about 5 centimetres (2 in) in length. The body is thin and black, and the female may have lighter spotting or mottling dorsally. The head is much wider than the rest of the body and is dark brown in color.

The insect can be found at bodies of stagnant water, such as ponds and ditches.

== Reproduction ==
Like all dragonflies, Tramea lacerata pairs mate in the "wheel" position. The female mates once and stores all the sperm she needs for fertilization. If she should mate again, the second male will remove the sperm of the first male from her body with the brush-like apparatus on his specially-adapted penis. During egg laying, the male releases the female so she can drop down to the water to release some eggs, whereupon she returns to the clutches of the male's claspers.

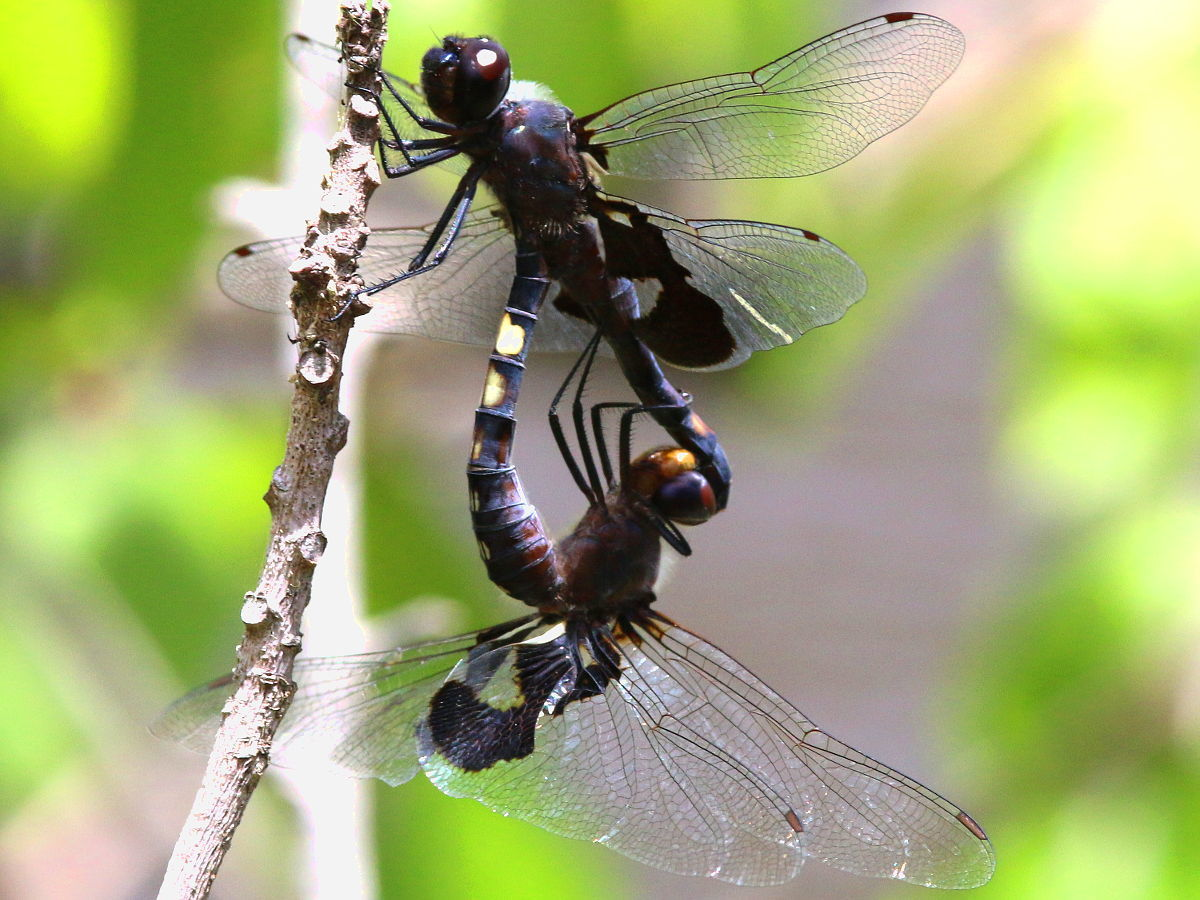
Mating wheel

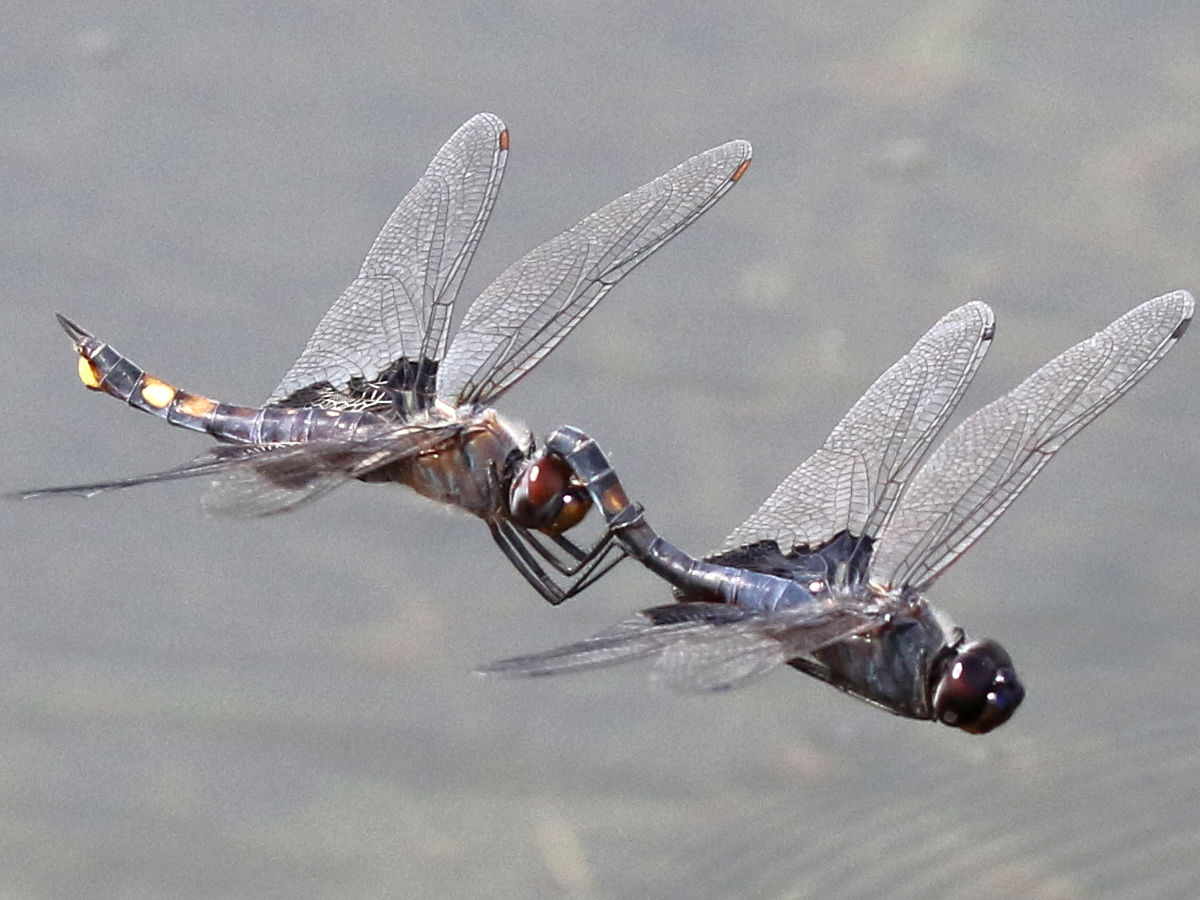
Tandem flight

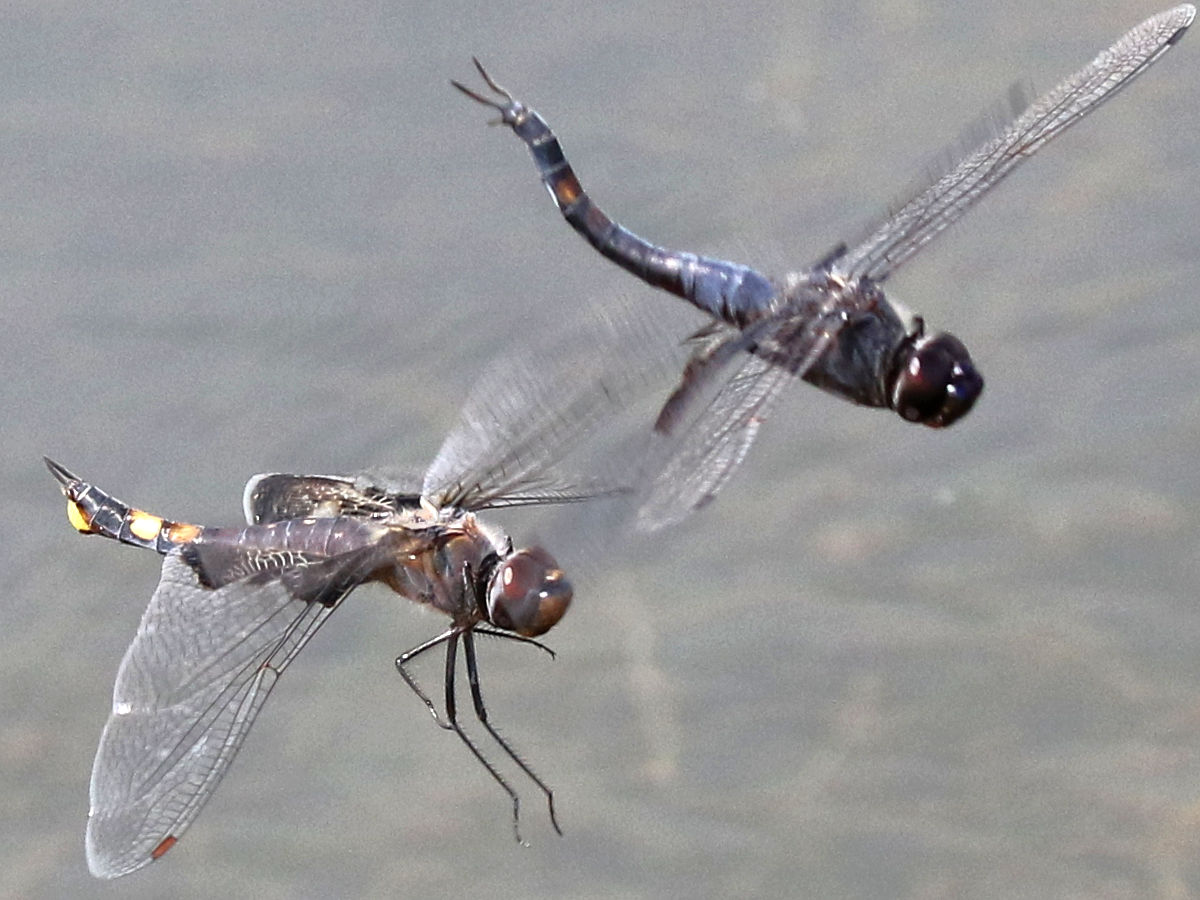
Pair separation

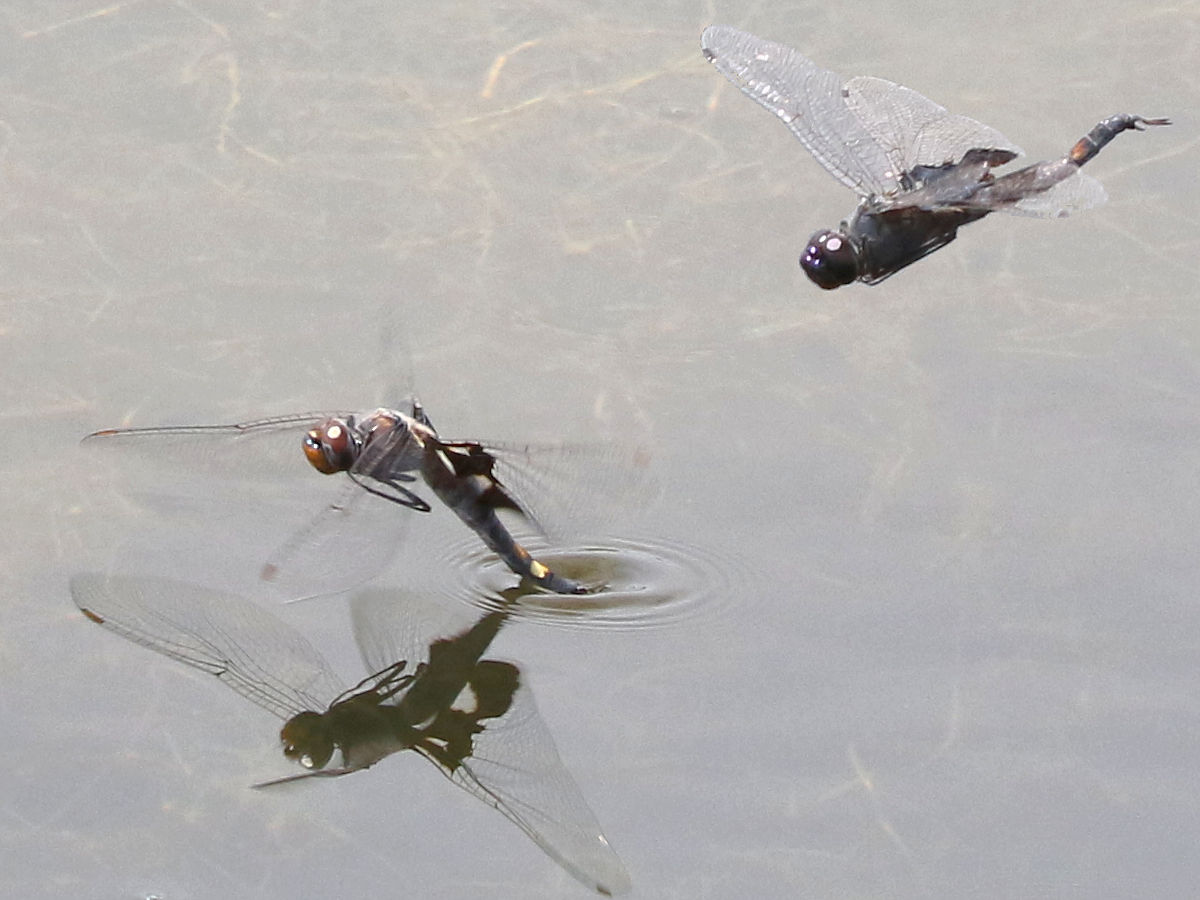
Guarded ovipositing

The larvae of the dragonflies hatch and eat anything they can catch, favoring a carnivorous diet of organisms smaller than themselves. Adults of the species, especially males, congregate in swarms. Some populations of this dragonfly undertake migrations. Both the larvae and adult forms are efficient predators of mosquitoes, so they are a helpful insect to have in wet areas where mosquito infestations occur.
