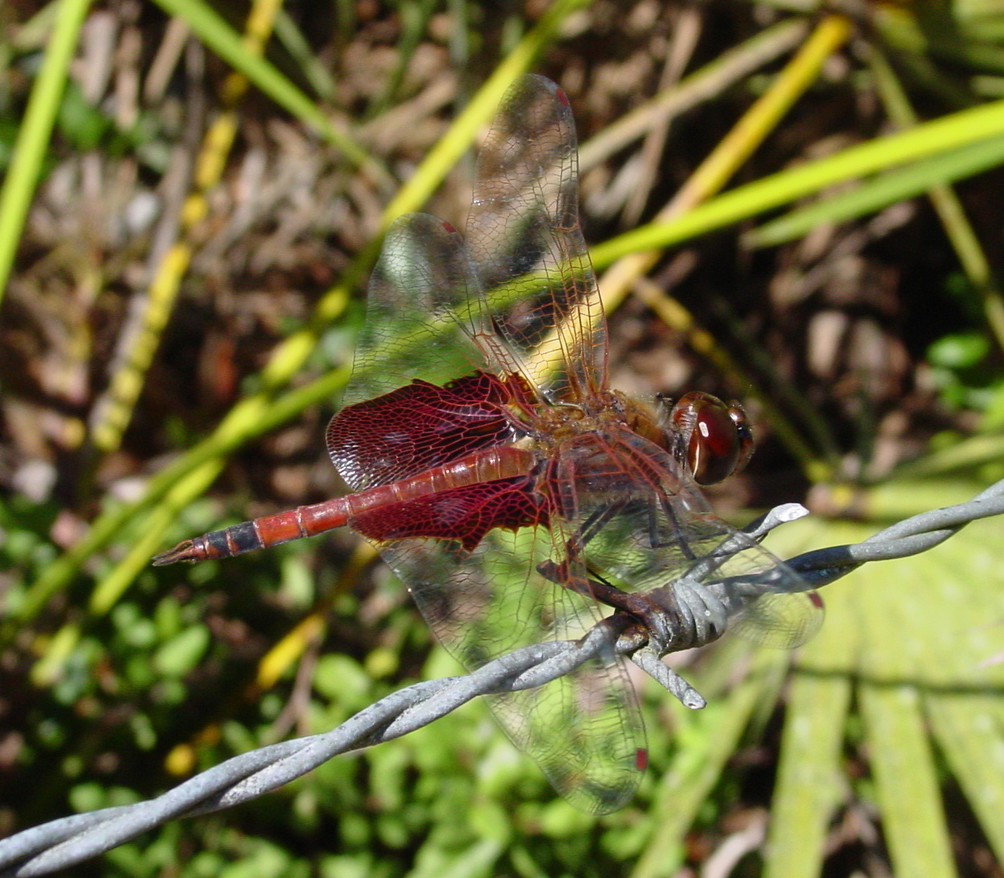

Conservation status
- Least Concern (IUCN 3.1)

Scientific classification
- Kingdom: Animalia
- Phylum: Arthropoda
- Class: Insecta
- Order: Odonata
- Infraorder: Anisoptera
- Family: Libellulidae
- Genus: Tramea
- Species: T. carolina

Binomial name
- Tramea carolina (Linnaeus, 1763)

= Tramea carolina =

Carolina saddlebags

Species of dragonfly

Tramea carolina, the Carolina saddlebags, is a species of dragonfly native to eastern North America.

== Description ==
The length of the Carolina saddlebags measures 45 to 54 mm (1.8 to 2.1 in). The thorax and basal part of each wing is brown. The eighth and ninth abdominal segments are black. In females, the abdomen and face are brownish red, and the basal part of the forehead is violet. In males, the abdomen and face are bright red, and the entire forehead is violet. Juvenile males resemble females.

== Distribution and habitat ==
The Carolina saddlebags is found from southern Nova Scotia to Florida and Bermuda west to Texas. It is seen all year in Florida and from May to August in Canada. Its habitats include ponds, lakes, swamps, and streams. It is not found near muddy water.

These aquatics environments will typically have partially or fully submerged vegetation that the larvae will live in.

== Behavior ==
Adults feed in groups from morning till evening, flying 2–7 m (7–23 ft) above the ground. They perch on the tips of stems or other objects.

The larval stage of the species is fully aquatic, living, hunting and feeding in their aquatic environment.
