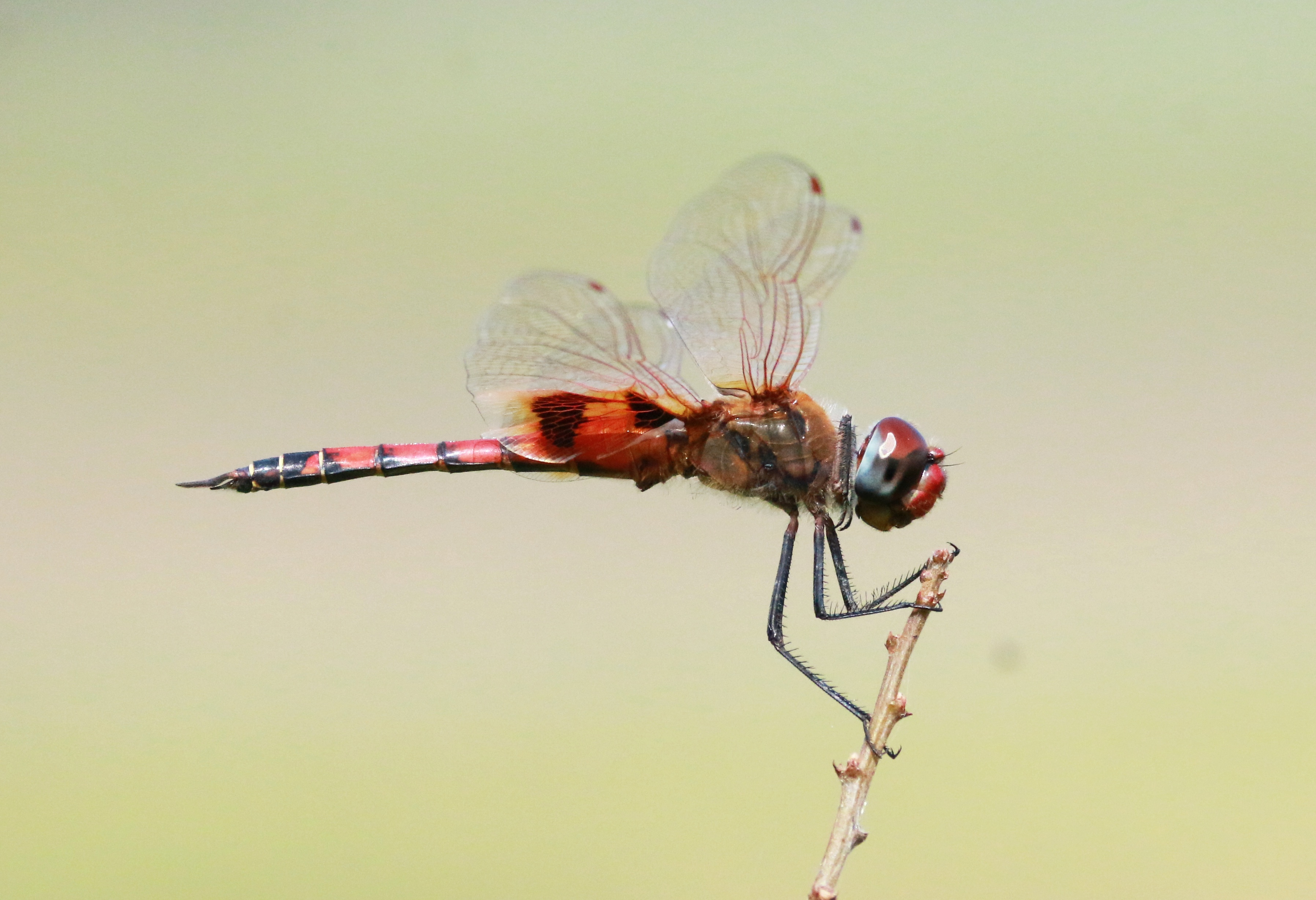
- male
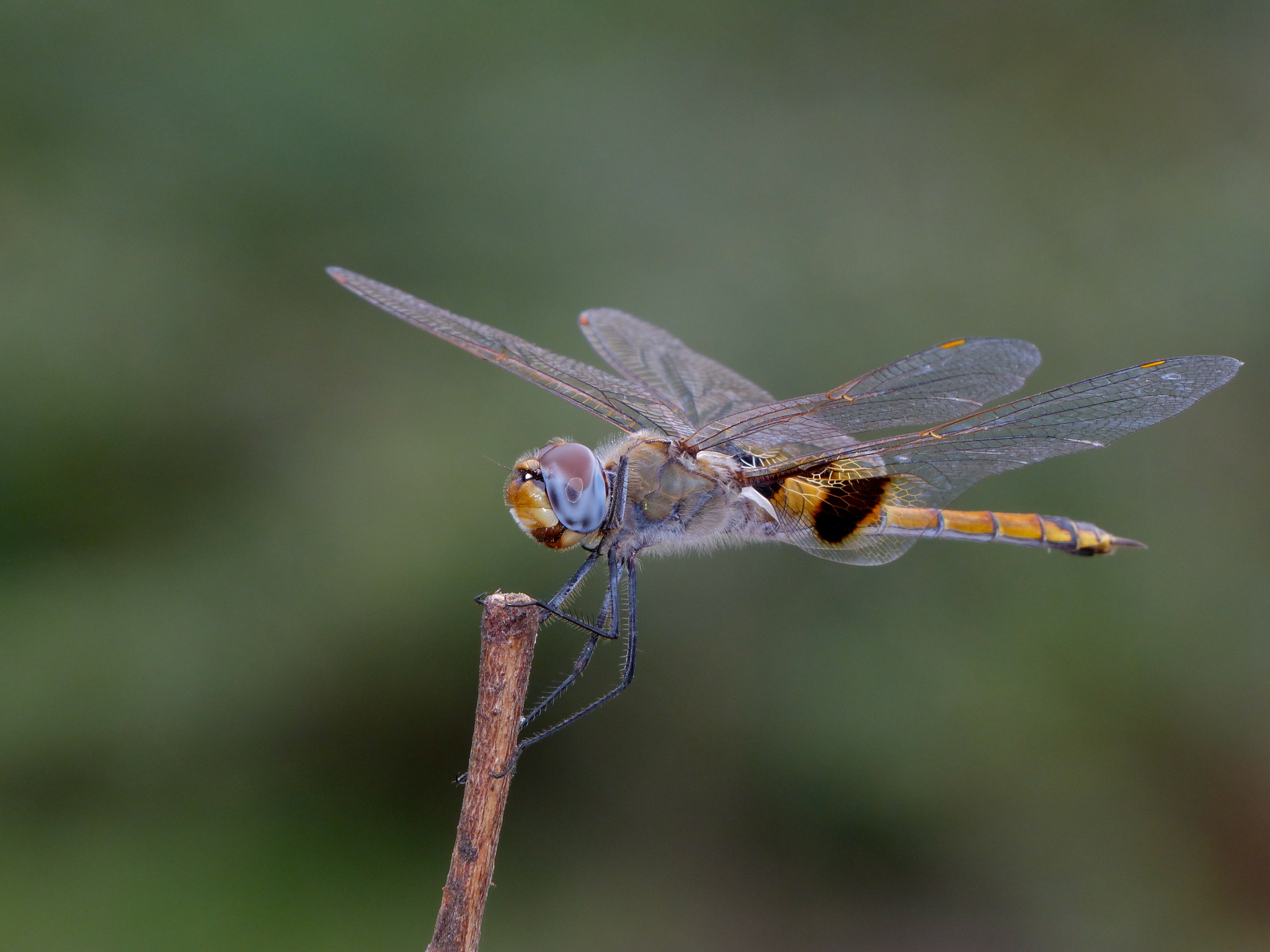
- female

Conservation status
- Least Concern (IUCN 3.1)

Scientific classification
- Kingdom: Animalia
- Phylum: Arthropoda
- Clade: Pancrustacea
- Class: Insecta
- Order: Odonata
- Infraorder: Anisoptera
- Superfamily: Libelluloidea
- Family: Libellulidae
- Genus: Tramea
- Species: T. basilaris

Binomial name
- Tramea basilaris (Palisot de Beauvois, 1817)

Synonyms
- Tramea burmeisteri Kirby, 1889; Trapezostigma basilare Palisot de Beauvois, 1817

= Tramea basilaris =

Species of dragonfly

Tramea basilaris, also known as the keyhole glider, red marsh trotter, or wheeling glider, is a species of dragonfly in the family Libellulidae. It is found throughout most of Africa, Arabia and in Asia. Capable of very long migration and nomadic flight, it reached Europe once, with a pair being recorded at the island of Linosa, Sicily (Italy) in 2016. Similarly, this species is able to use the trade winds to reach the Caribbean and South Americas, where it has been spotted in Bonaire, Venezuela, and Martinique.

== Description and habitat ==
It is a medium-sized red dragonfly with extremely long anal appendages. It can be distinguished from other species of this genus by the two brownish black hind-wing patch surrounded by a golden yellow areola in the base. Female is similar to male; but yellowish in color.

This species is found at pools, ponds, marshes, lakes and water tanks. Typical reproducing habitats are grassy marshes and ponds, but this species may be found anywhere during migrations. They are seen in tireless soaring flight in sunny days, sometimes in conspecific groups or in mixed groups of other soaring dragonflies like Pantala flavescens or Hydrobasileus croceus. It perches on exposed twigs; sometimes with the abdomen held downwards to balance in wind.

== See also ==
- List of odonates of Sri Lanka
- List of odonates of India
- List of odonata of Kerala
