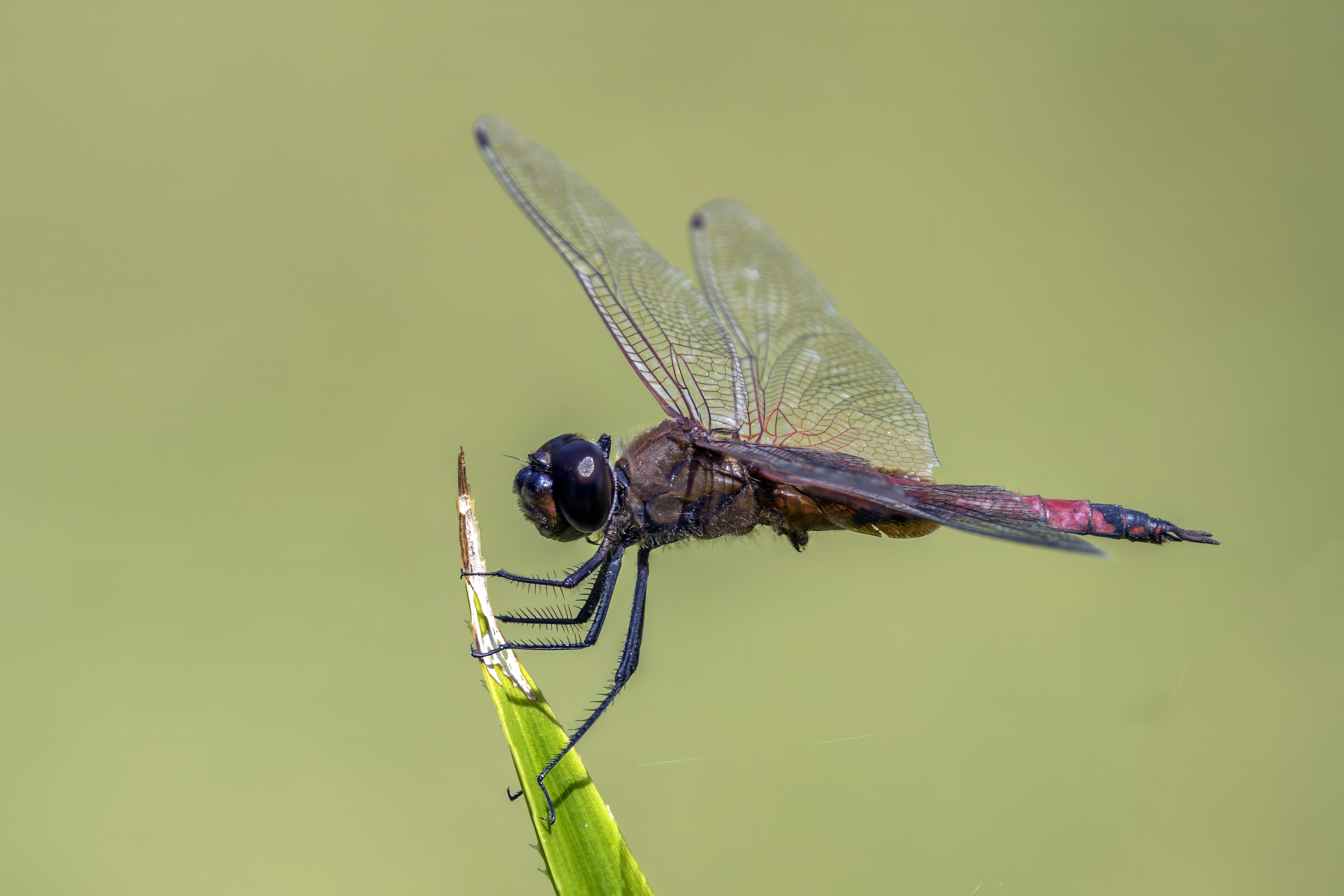
- Male, Cook Islands

Conservation status
- Least Concern (IUCN 3.1)

Scientific classification
- Kingdom: Animalia
- Phylum: Arthropoda
- Clade: Pancrustacea
- Class: Insecta
- Order: Odonata
- Infraorder: Anisoptera
- Family: Libellulidae
- Genus: Tramea
- Species: T. transmarina

Binomial name
- Tramea transmarina Brauer, 1867

Synonyms
- Tramea samoensis Brauer, 1867; Trapezostigma euryale Selys, 1878; Tramea propinqua Lieftinck, 1942

= Tramea transmarina =

Species of dragonfly

Tramea transmarina, commonly known as the red glider or northern glider, is a species of dragonfly in the family Libellulidae.

The species occurs across islands of the Pacific, northern Australia and parts of Southeast Asia. The type locality is Fiji.

== Taxonomic history ==
In 1867, Brauer described Tramea transmarina from specimens collected in Fiji. In the same work he also described Tramea samoensis from Samoa, later treated as a synonym of Tramea transmarina.

In 1878, Selys described Tramea euryale from material collected in New Guinea and neighbouring islands. The species was later regarded as closely related to Tramea transmarina.

In 1942, Lieftinck described Tramea propinqua from New Guinea and nearby islands, distinguishing it from Tramea transmarina and Tramea euryale by the extent and shape of the dark hindwing patch and differences in the male secondary genitalia.

Some authorities, including the World Odonata List, now treat Tramea propinqua as a synonym of Tramea transmarina, while others such as the Australian Faunal Directory continue to recognise it as a separate species.

== Description ==
Tramea transmarina is a medium to large dragonfly with dark patches at the base of the hindwings, characteristic of species in the genus Tramea.

The dark hindwing patch is narrow and elongate, not reaching the base of the wing triangle. A pale clear patch behind the membranule, when present, is narrow and does not extend beyond the first vein descending into the anal field.

Males have a metallic purple marking on the upper surface of the head. The secondary genitalia are distinctive and were used by Lieftinck to separate related Indo-Pacific forms.

== Distribution and habitat ==
Tramea transmarina occurs across many Pacific islands, northern Australia and parts of Southeast Asia.

The species inhabits still waters including ponds, lagoons and wetlands.

== Etymology ==
The genus name Tramea is derived from the Latin trameare ("to pass through" or "travel across"), referring to the migratory or vagrant behaviour of species in the genus.

The former genus name Trapezostigma is derived from the Greek τραπέζιον (trapezion, "trapezium") and στίγμα (stigma, "spot" or "mark"), likely referring to the shape of the pterostigma.

The species name transmarina is derived from the Latin trans ("across" or "beyond") and marinus ("of the sea"), likely referring to Fiji, where the original specimens were collected.

== Gallery ==
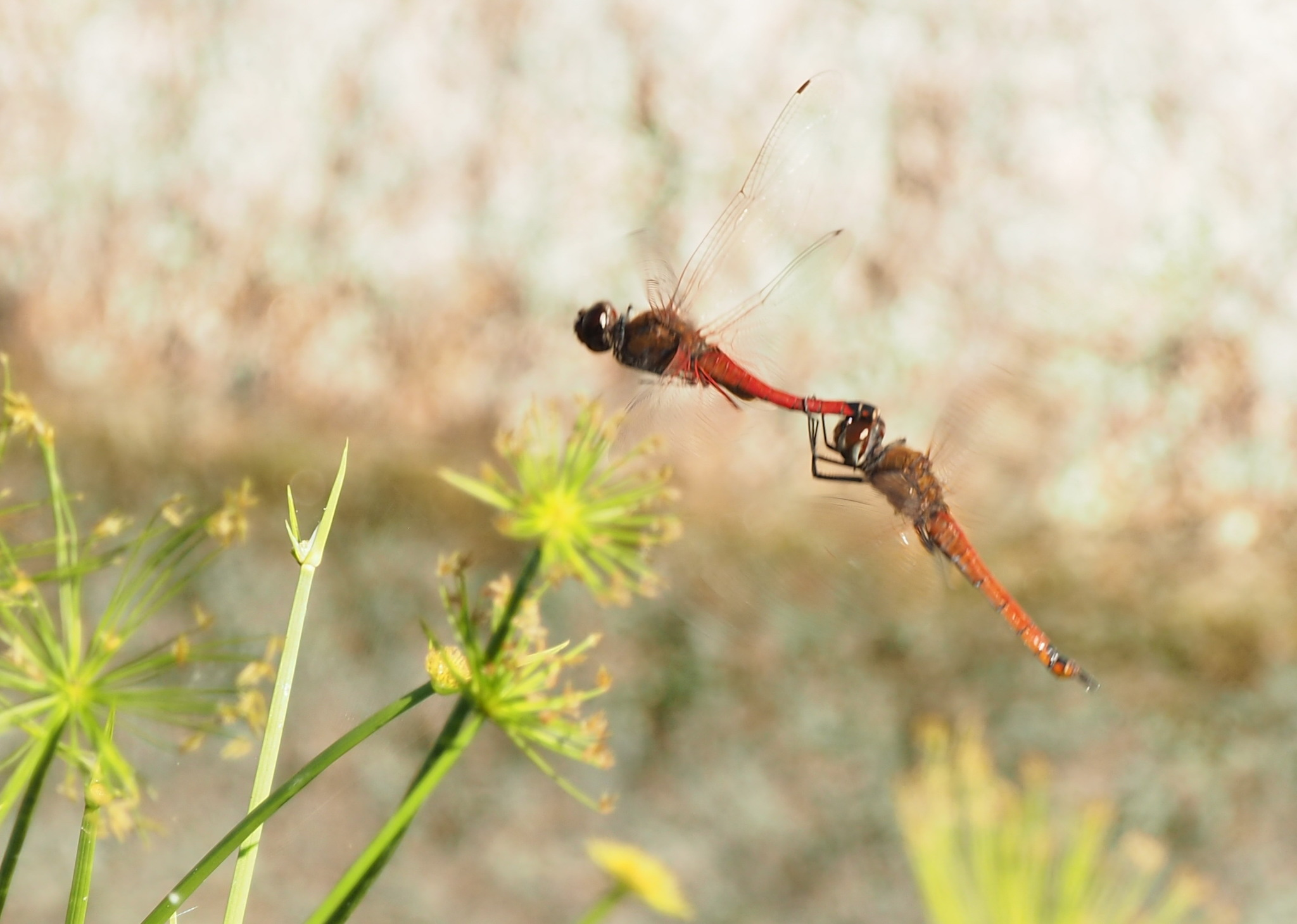
Mating pair

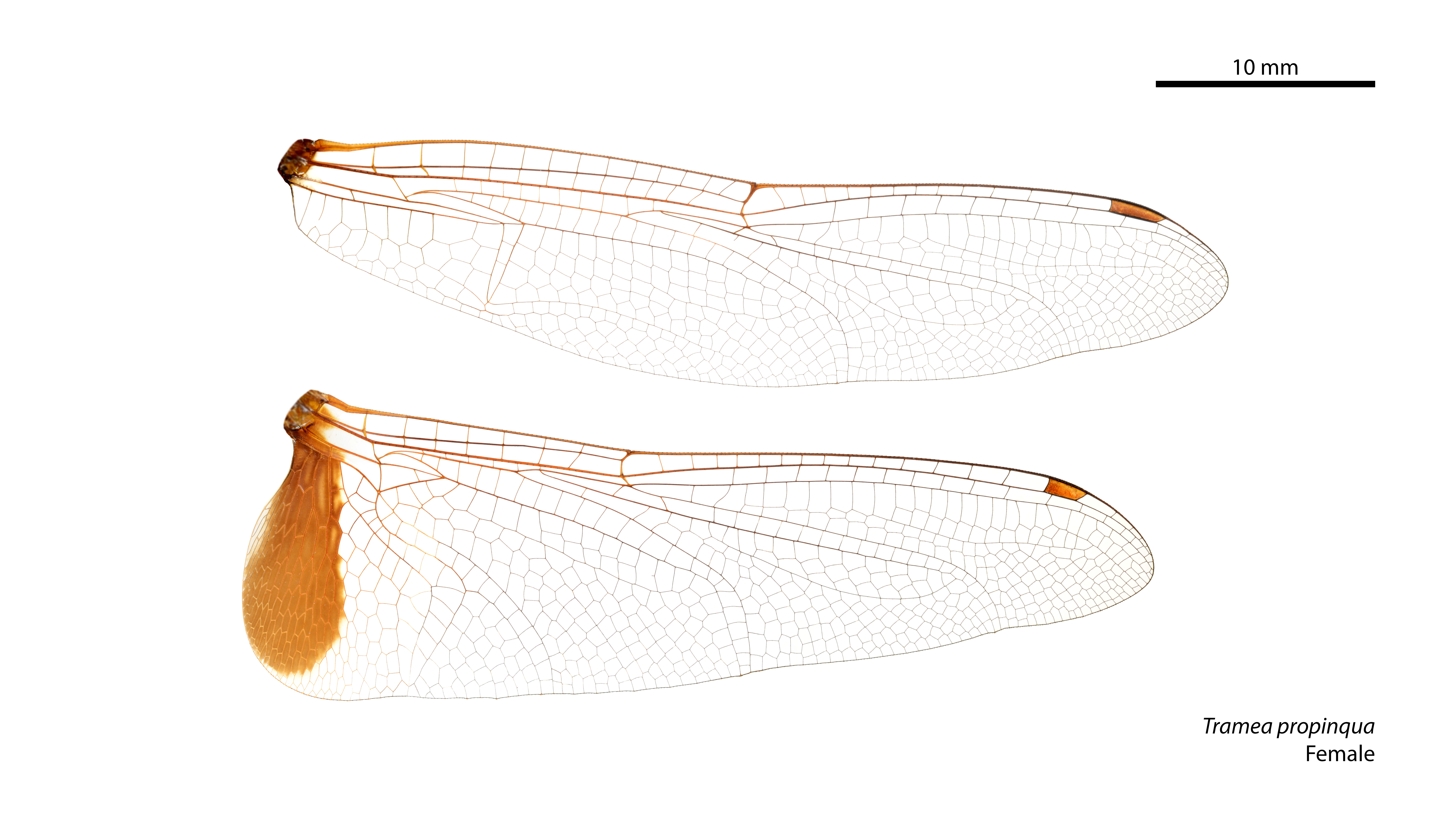
Female

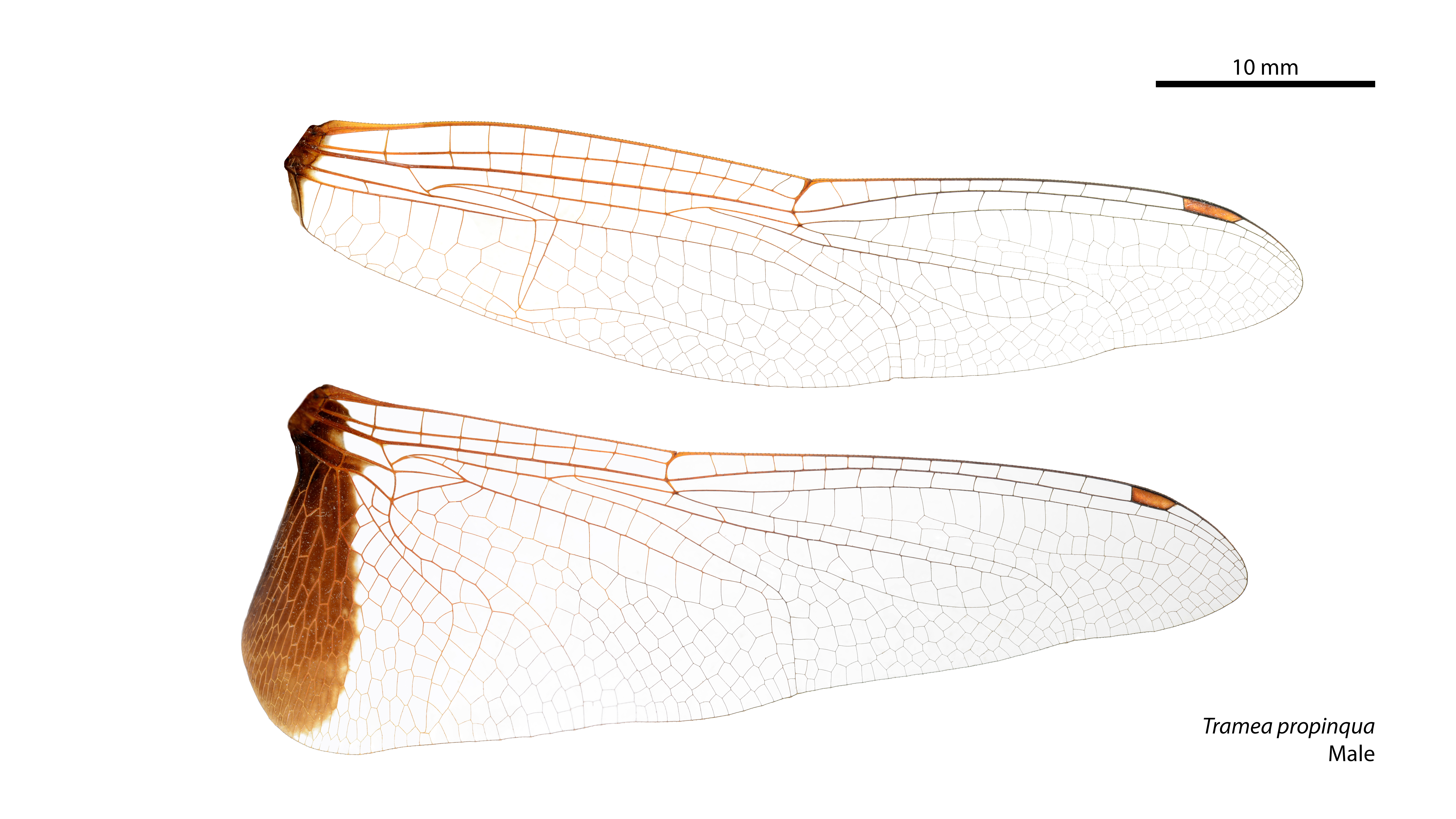
Male
