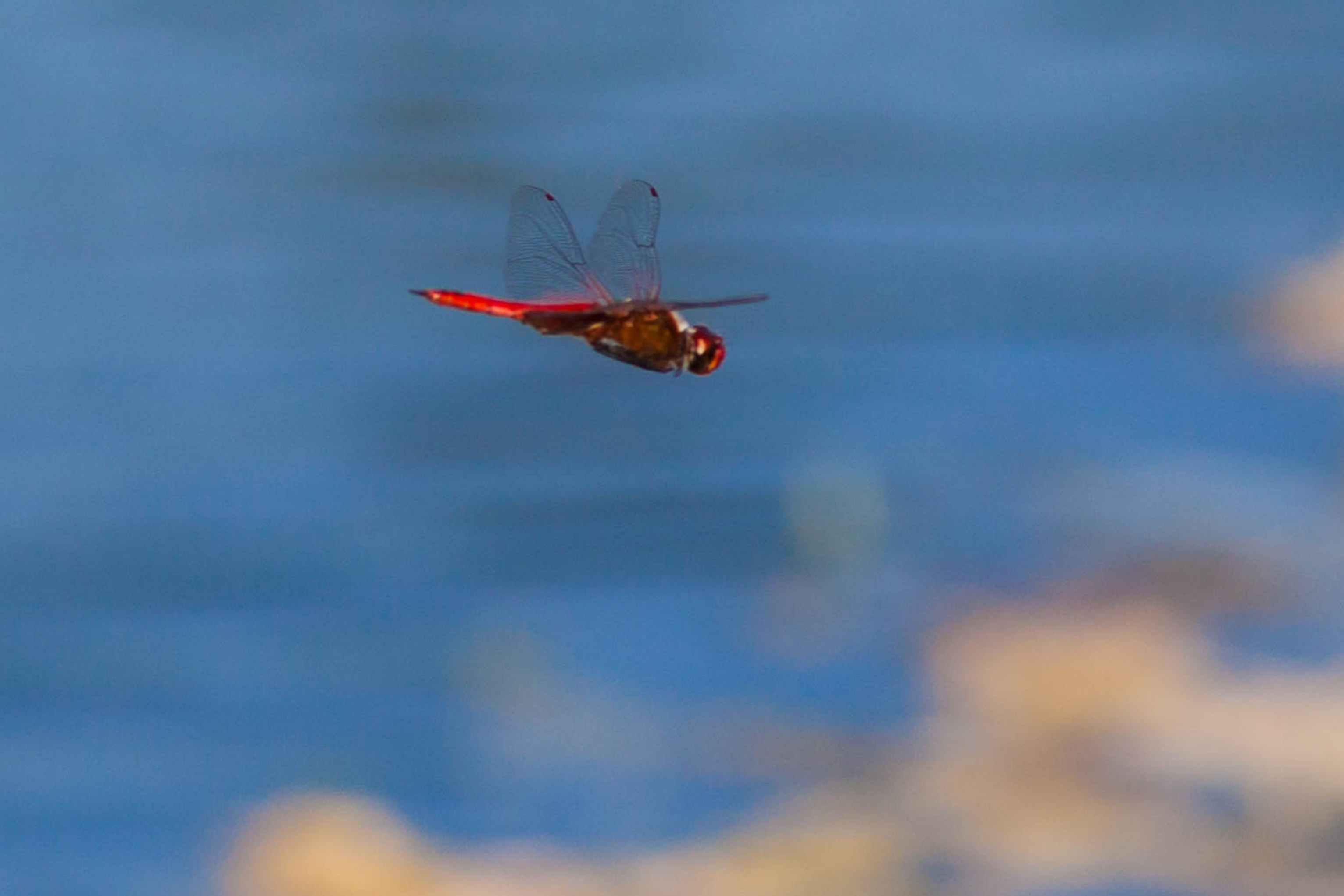

Conservation status
- Least Concern (IUCN 3.1)

Scientific classification
- Kingdom: Animalia
- Phylum: Arthropoda
- Class: Insecta
- Order: Odonata
- Infraorder: Anisoptera
- Family: Libellulidae
- Genus: Tramea
- Species: T. abdominalis

Binomial name
- Tramea abdominalis (Rambur, 1842)

= Tramea abdominalis =

Species of dragonfly

Tramea abdominalis, the vermilion saddlebags, is a species of skimmer in the dragonfly family Libellulidae. It is found in the Caribbean Sea, Central America, North America, Oceania, and South America.

The IUCN conservation status of Tramea abdominalis is "LC", least concern, with no immediate threat to the species' survival. The population is stable. The IUCN status was reviewed in 2017.
