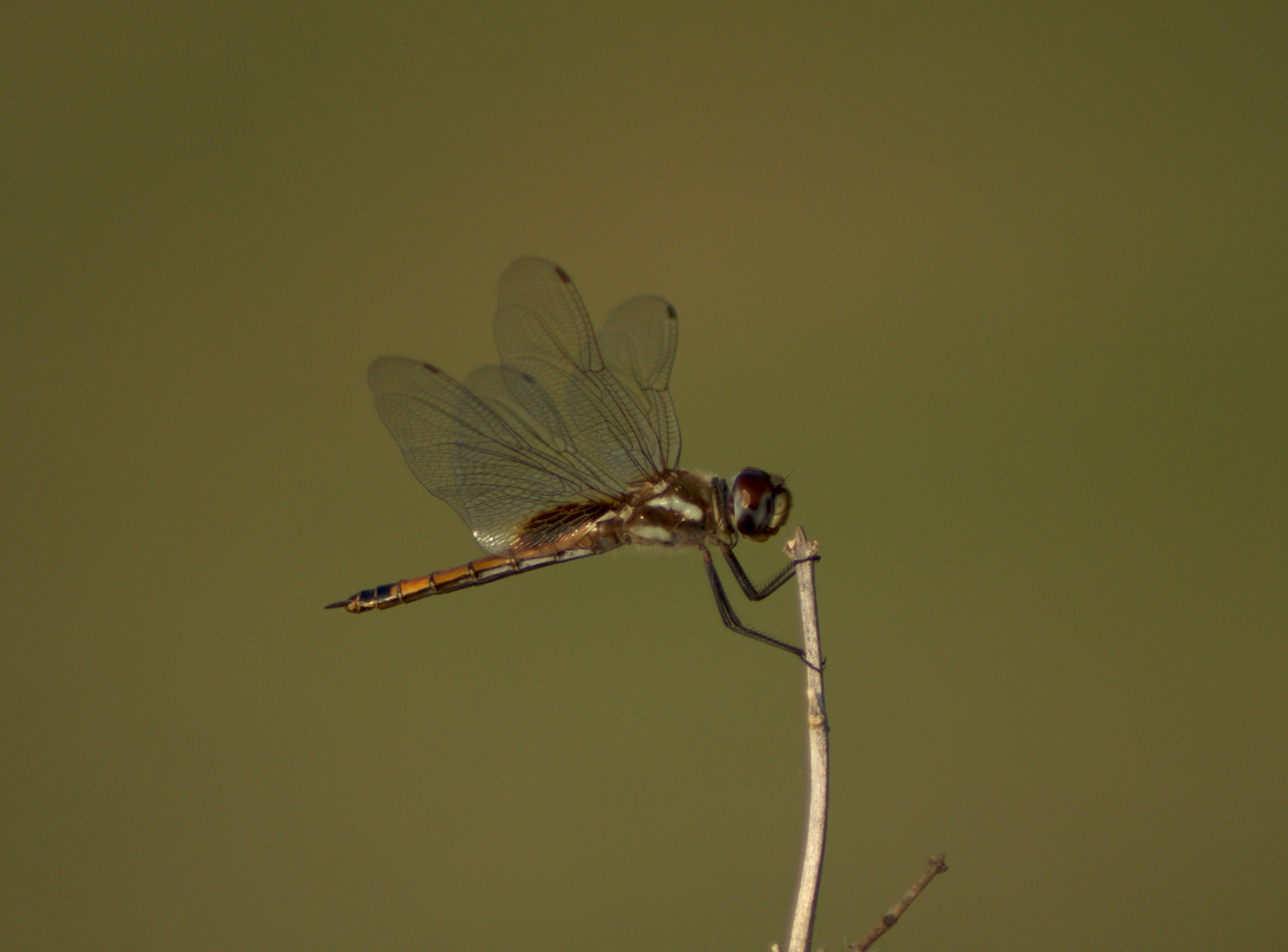

Conservation status
- Least Concern (IUCN 3.1)

Scientific classification
- Kingdom: Animalia
- Phylum: Arthropoda
- Clade: Pancrustacea
- Class: Insecta
- Order: Odonata
- Suborder: Anisoptera
- Superfamily: Libelluloidea
- Family: Libellulidae
- Genus: Tramea
- Species: T. calverti

Binomial name
- Tramea calverti Muttkowski, 1910

= Tramea calverti =

Species of dragonfly

Tramea calverti, the striped saddlebags, is a species of skimmer in the dragonfly family Libellulidae. It is found in the Caribbean Sea, Central America, North America, and South America.

The IUCN conservation status of Tramea calverti is "LC", least concern, with no immediate threat to the species' survival. The population is stable. The IUCN status was reviewed in 2017.

"Based on molecular and morphological analyses, and following the principle of priority in taxonomic nomenclature, Tramea calverti is referred to by its older name, T. darwini; from which T. calverti becomes a junior subjective synonym (Lorenzo-Carballa et al. 2020, Paulson et al. 2024)."
