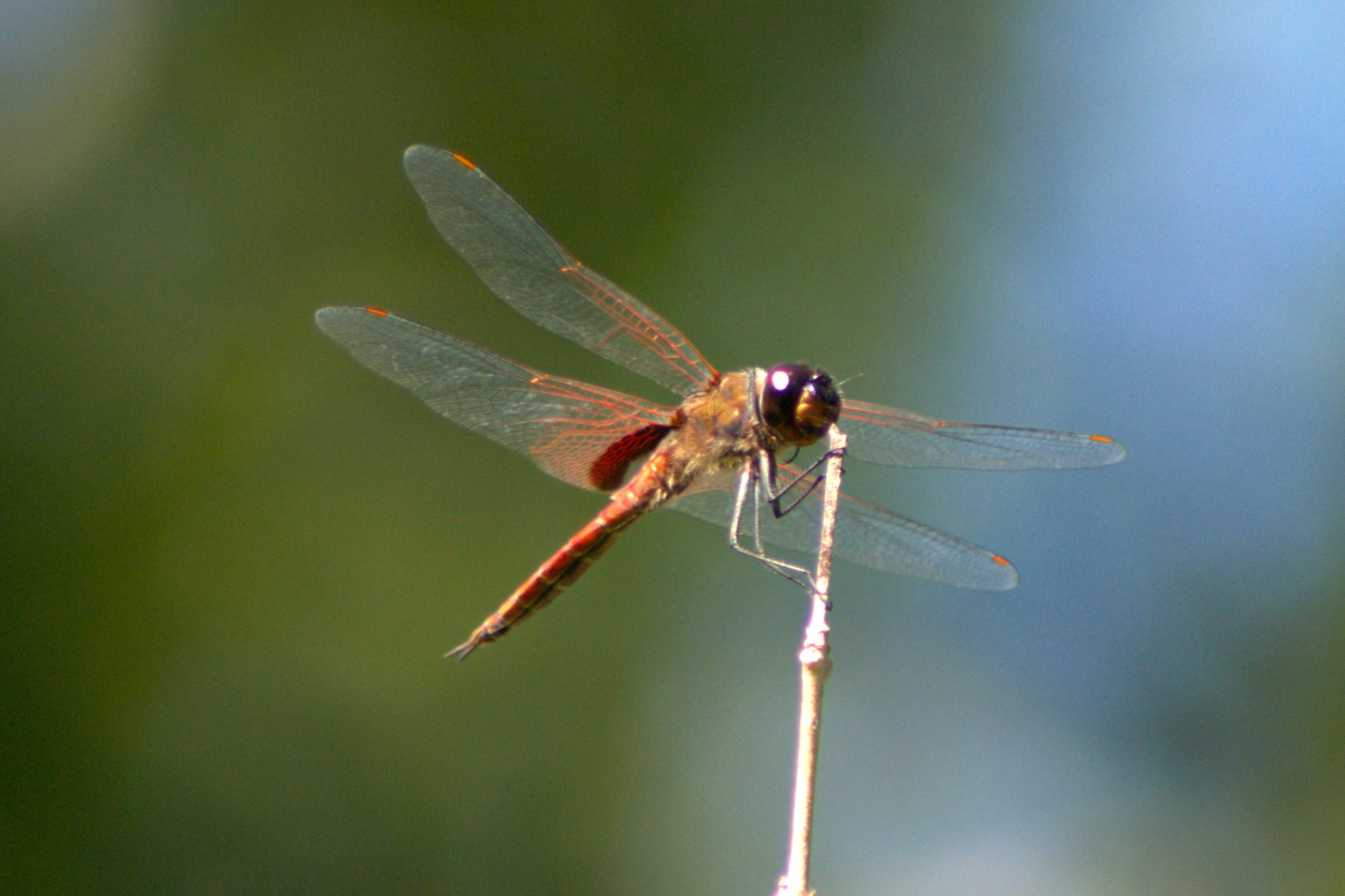

Conservation status
- Least Concern (IUCN 3.1)

Scientific classification
- Kingdom: Animalia
- Phylum: Arthropoda
- Class: Insecta
- Order: Odonata
- Infraorder: Anisoptera
- Family: Libellulidae
- Genus: Tramea
- Species: T. insularis

Binomial name
- Tramea insularis Hagen, 1861

= Tramea insularis =

Species of dragonfly

Tramea insularis, the Antillean saddlebags, is a species of skimmer in the family Libellulidae. It is found in the Caribbean, Central America, and North America.

The IUCN conservation status of Tramea insularis is "LC", least concern, with no immediate threat to the species' survival. The population is stable.
