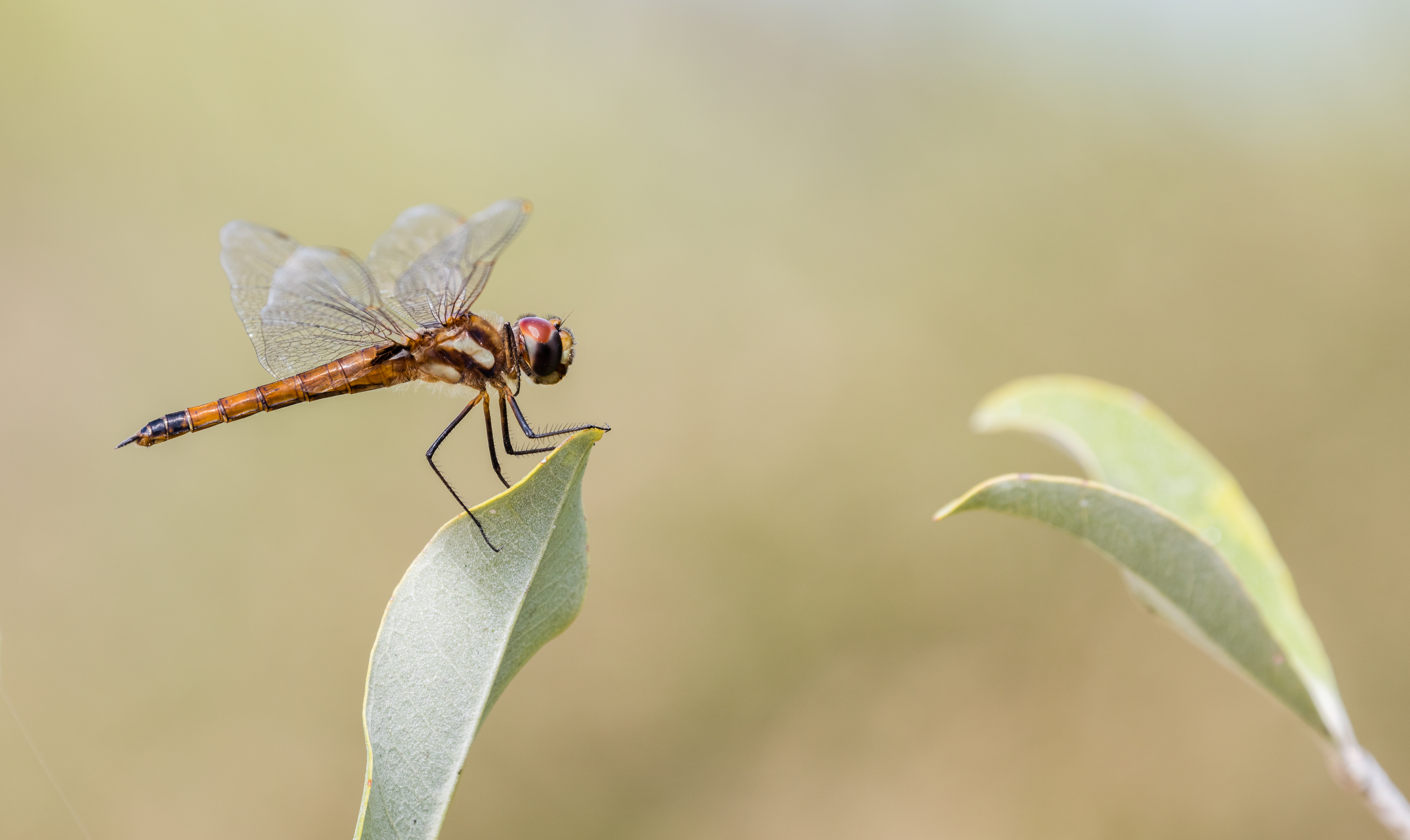
- In the Galápagos Islands

Scientific classification
- Kingdom: Animalia
- Phylum: Arthropoda
- Clade: Pancrustacea
- Class: Insecta
- Order: Odonata
- Infraorder: Anisoptera
- Family: Libellulidae
- Subfamily: Trameinae
- Tribe: Trameini
- Genus: Tramea; Hagen, 1861

Synonyms
- Trapezostigma Hagen, 1849

= Tramea =

Genus of dragonflies

Tramea is a genus of dragonflies in the family Libellulidae, the skimmers and perchers. Members of the genus occur throughout tropical and subtropical regions worldwide.

Tramea dragonflies typically have dark or coloured patches at the bases of their hindwings, creating the appearance of saddlebags when in flight. This feature gives rise to the common names saddlebags and saddlebag gliders.

== Taxonomic history ==
In 1849, Hagen introduced the name Trapezostigma for dragonflies characterised by their distinctive wing markings. In 1861, Hagen established Tramea as a genus, shortening the earlier name Trapezostigma and incorporating an allusion to the Latin trameare ("to pass through"), referring to the migratory behaviour of species in the genus.

== Description ==
Species of Tramea are medium-sized to large dragonflies with conspicuous dark patches at the bases of the hindwings. The hindwings have a distinctive arrangement of veins and cells near the wing base.

Species of Tramea are strong fliers and many are highly migratory or nomadic, occurring throughout tropical and warm temperate regions worldwide.

== Species ==
The genus Tramea includes the following species, some of which have subspecies:

- Tramea abdominalis (Rambur, 1842) – Vermilion Saddlebags
- Tramea aquila Lieftinck, 1942
- Tramea basilaris (Palisot de Beauvois, 1805) – Keyhole Glider, Wheeling Glider, Red Marsh Trotter
- Tramea binotata (Rambur, 1842) – Sooty Saddlebags
- Tramea carolina (Linnaeus, 1763) – Carolina Saddlebags
- Tramea cophysa Hagen, 1867
- Tramea darwini Kirby, 1889 – Striped Saddlebags
- Tramea eurybia Selys, 1878
- Tramea insularis Hagen, 1861 – Antillean Saddlebags
- Tramea lacerata Hagen, 1861 – Black Saddlebags
- Tramea liberata Lieftinck, 1949
- Tramea limbata (Desjardins, 1832) – Ferrugineus Glider, Voyaging Glider, Black Marsh Trotter
- Tramea loewii Kaup in Brauer, 1866 – Common Glider
- Tramea minuta De Marmels & Rácenis, 1982
- Tramea onusta Hagen, 1861 – Red Saddlebags, Red-mantled Saddlebags
- Tramea phaeoneura Lieftinck, 1953
- Tramea rosenbergi Brauer, 1866
- Tramea rustica De Marmels & Rácenis, 1982
- Tramea stenoloba (Watson, 1962) - Narrow-lobed glider
- Tramea transmarina Brauer, 1867 – Red Glider
- Tramea virginia (Rambur, 1842)

== Etymology ==
The genus name Tramea is derived from the Latin trameare ("to pass through" or "travel across"), referring to the migratory or vagrant behaviour of species in the genus.

The earlier name Trapezostigma is derived from the Greek τραπέζιον (trapezion, "trapezium") and στίγμα (stigma, "spot" or "mark"), likely referring to the shape of the pterostigma.

== Gallery ==
Wing markings in species of Tramea are distinctive and vary considerably between species.

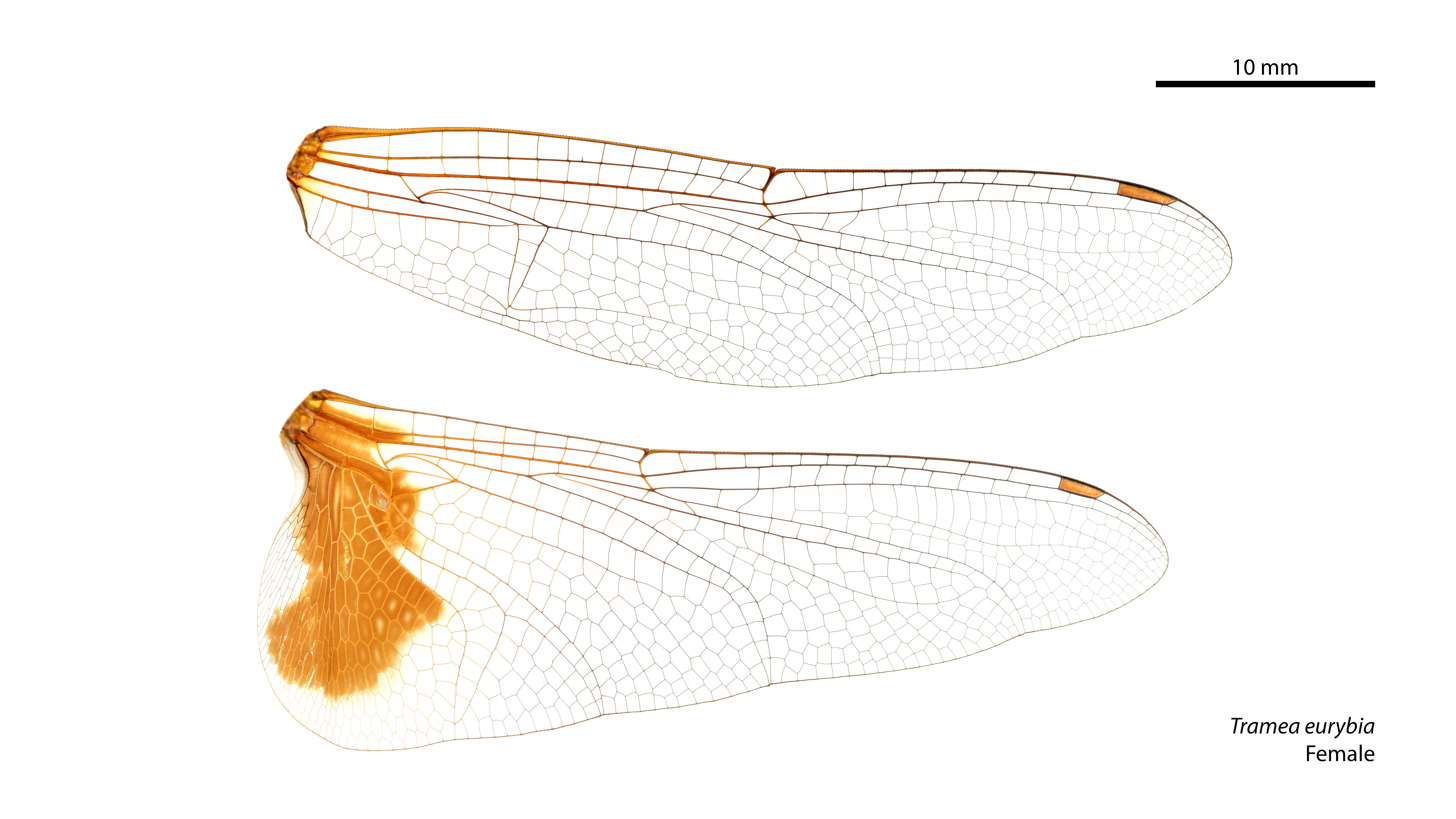
Female Tramea eurybia wings

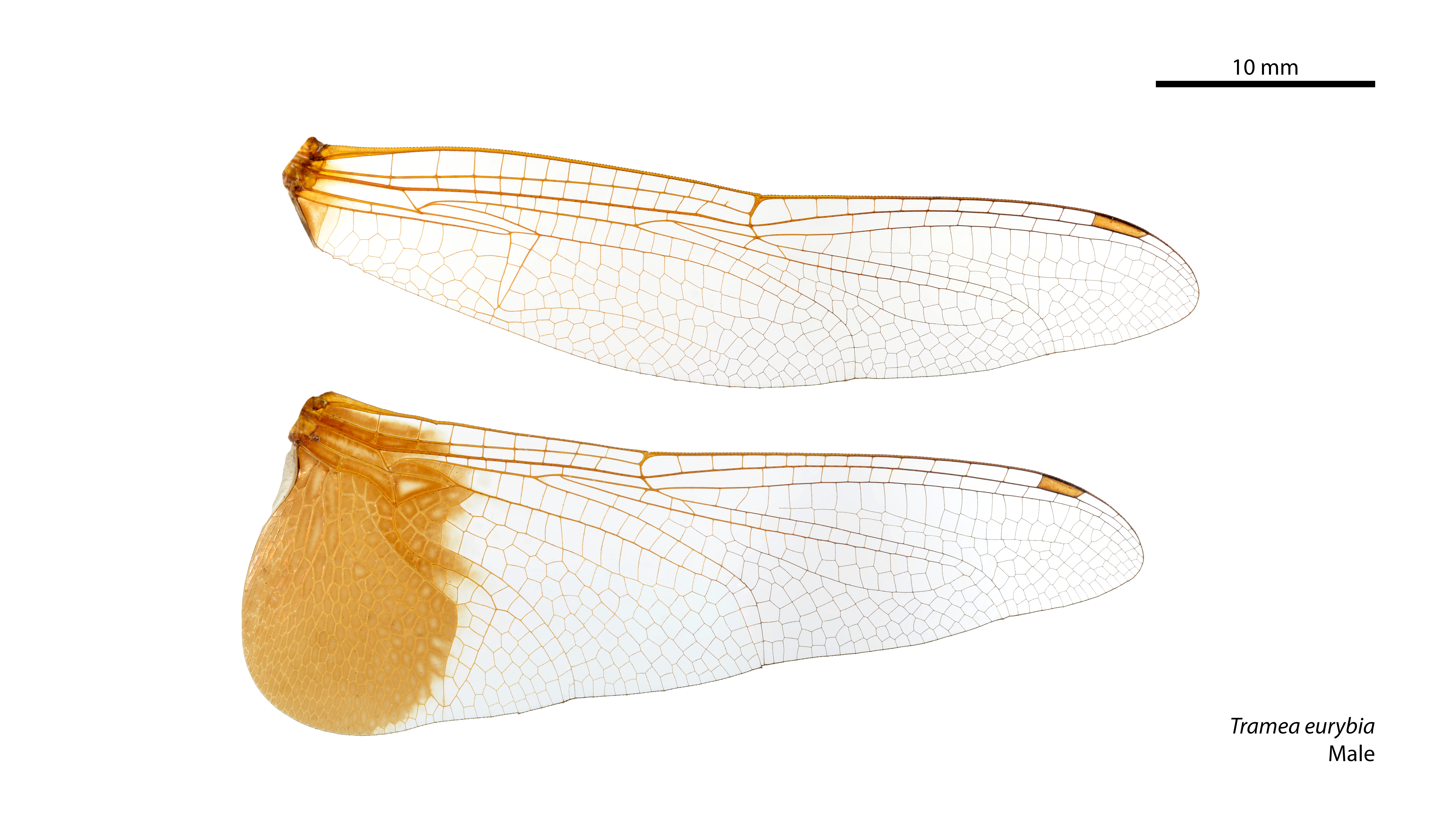
Male Tramea eurybia wings

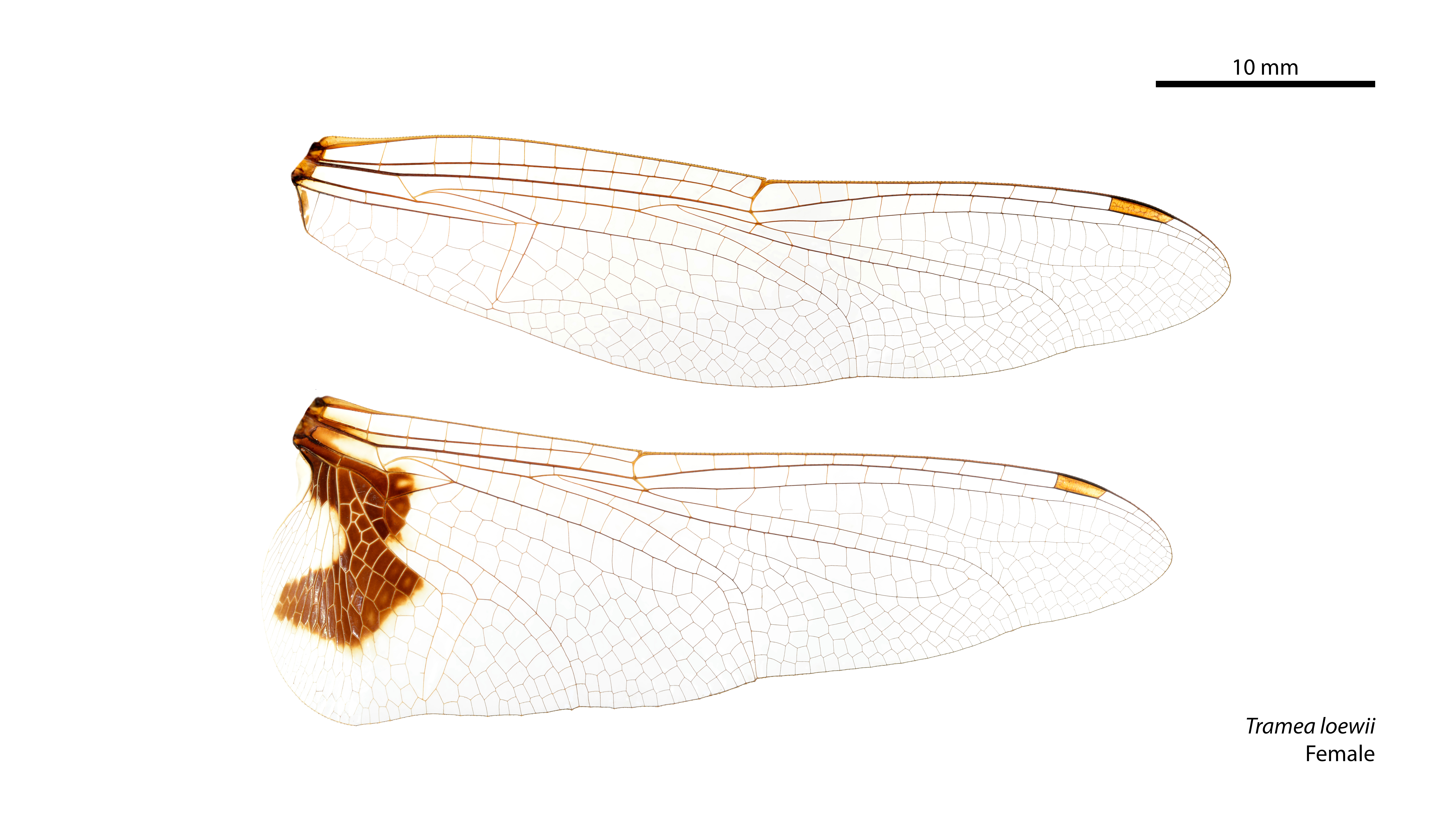
Female Tramea loewii wings

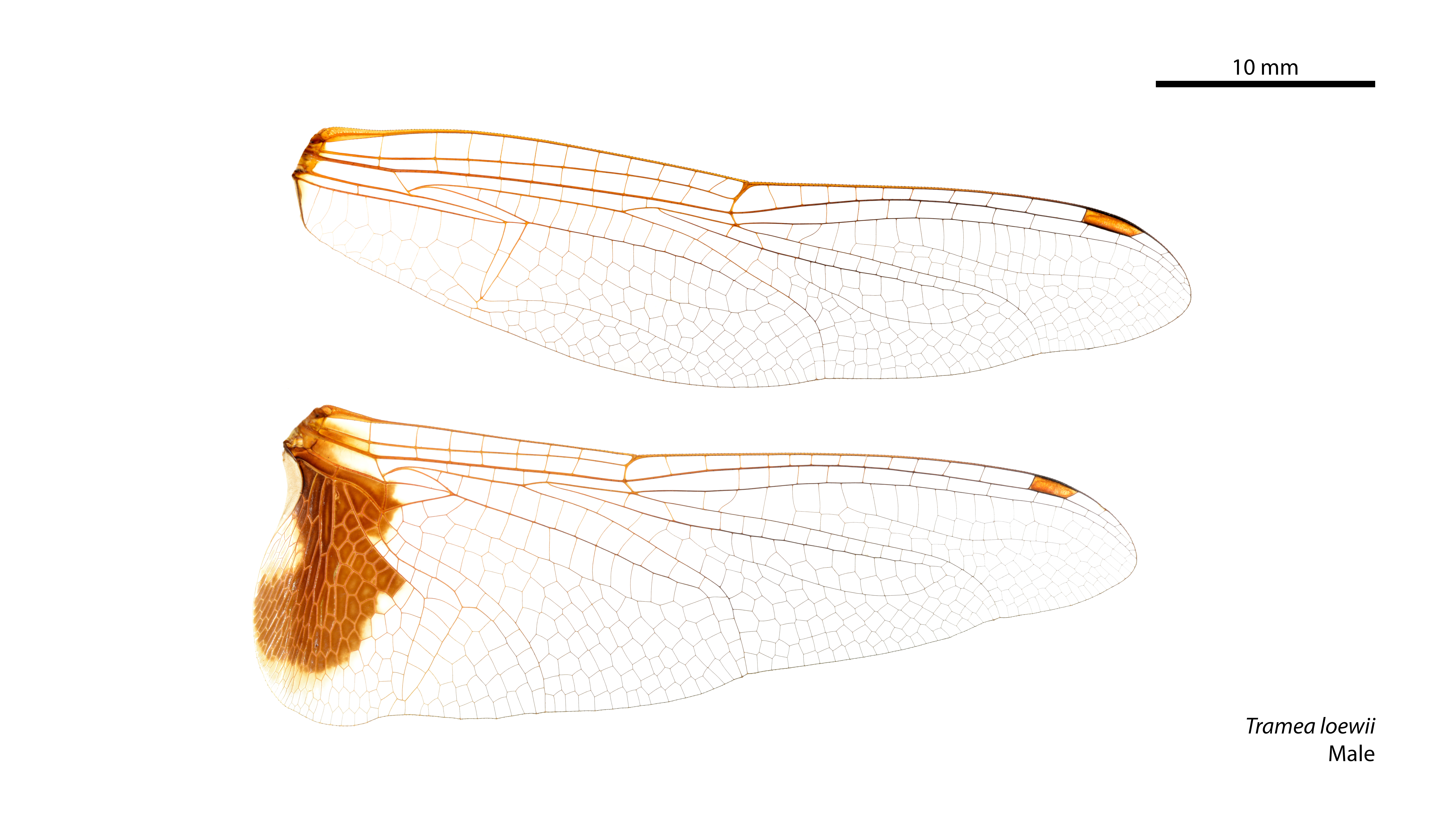
Male Tramea loewii wings

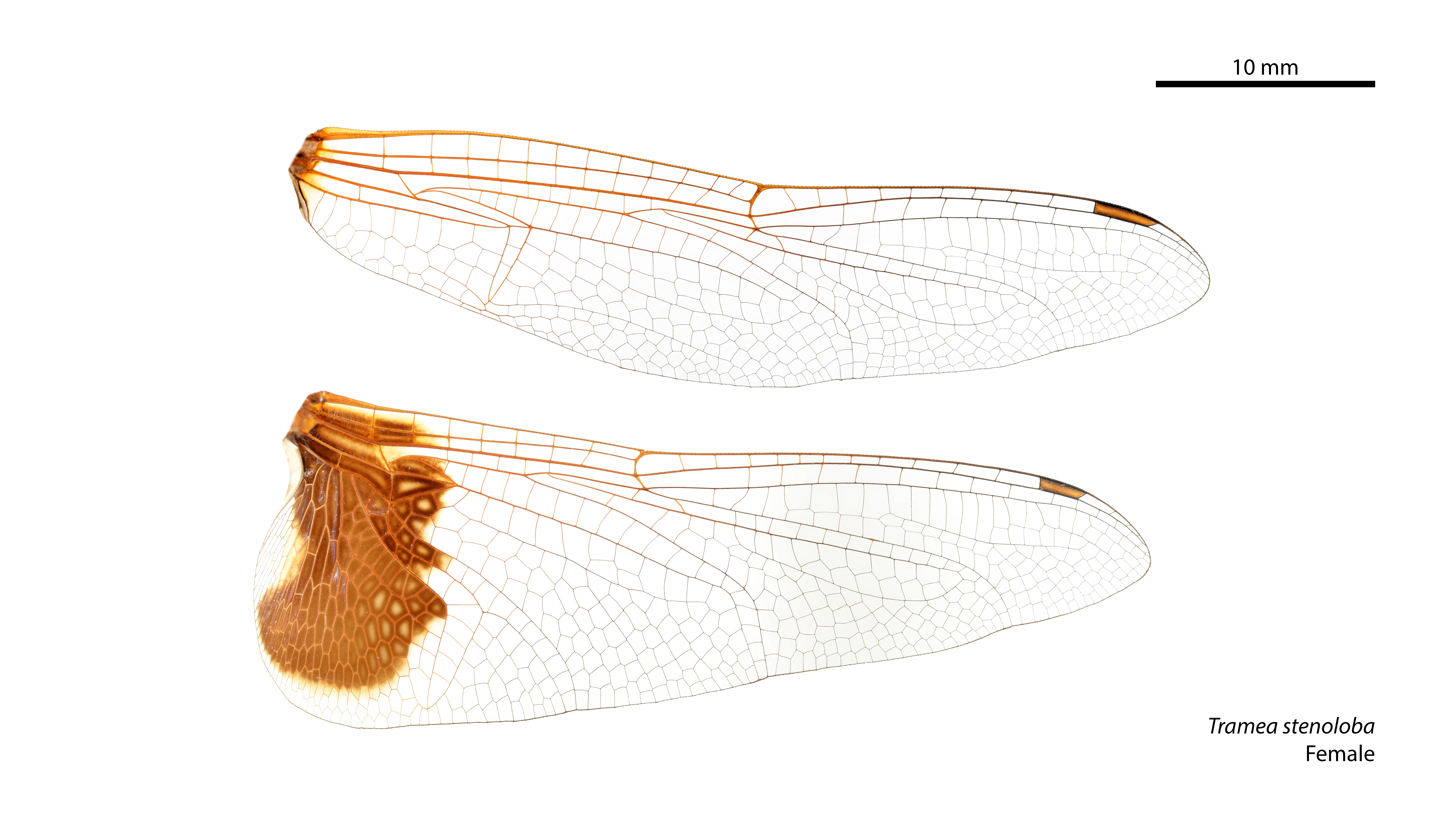
Female Tramea stenoloba wings

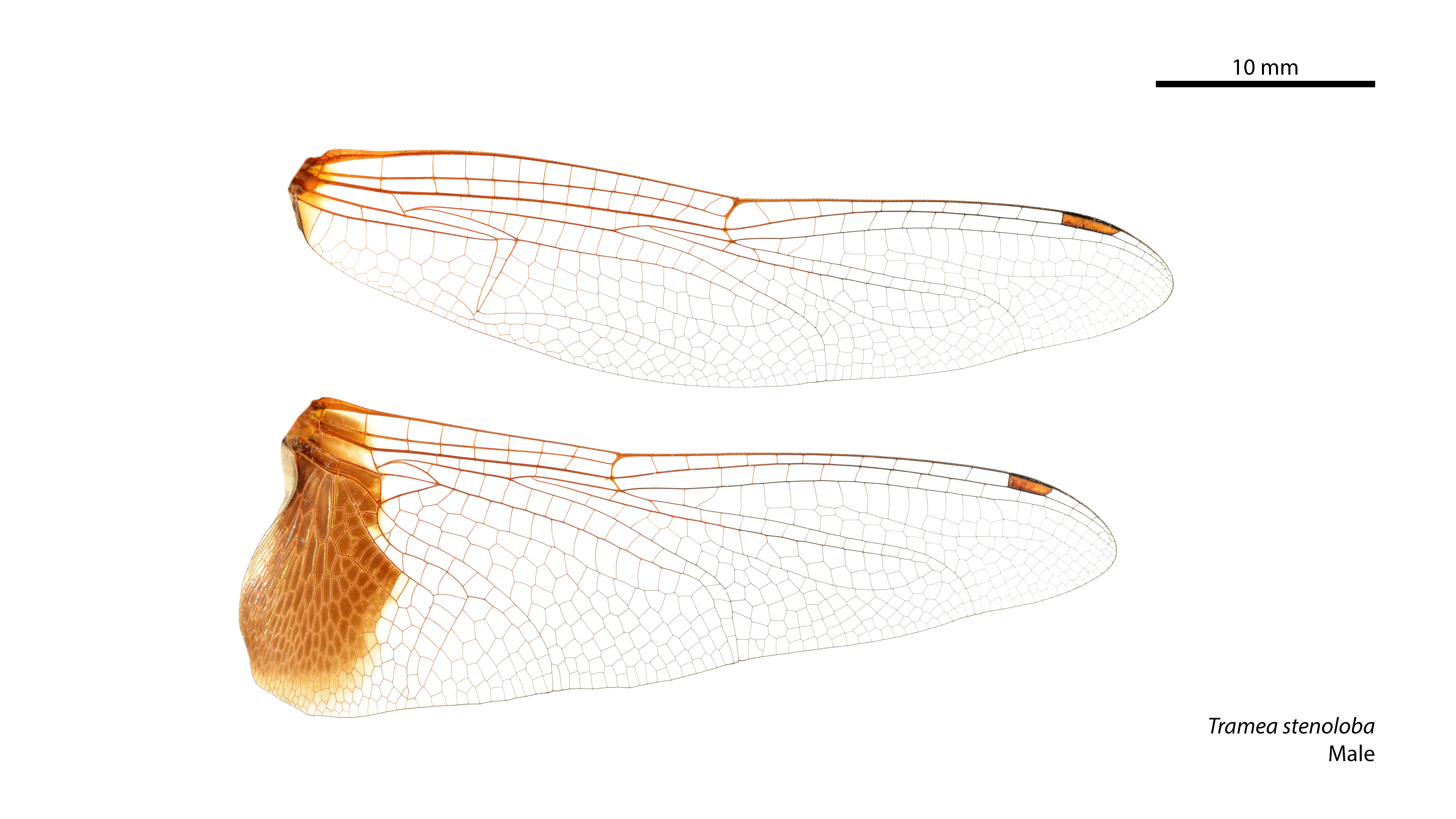
Male Tramea stenoloba wings

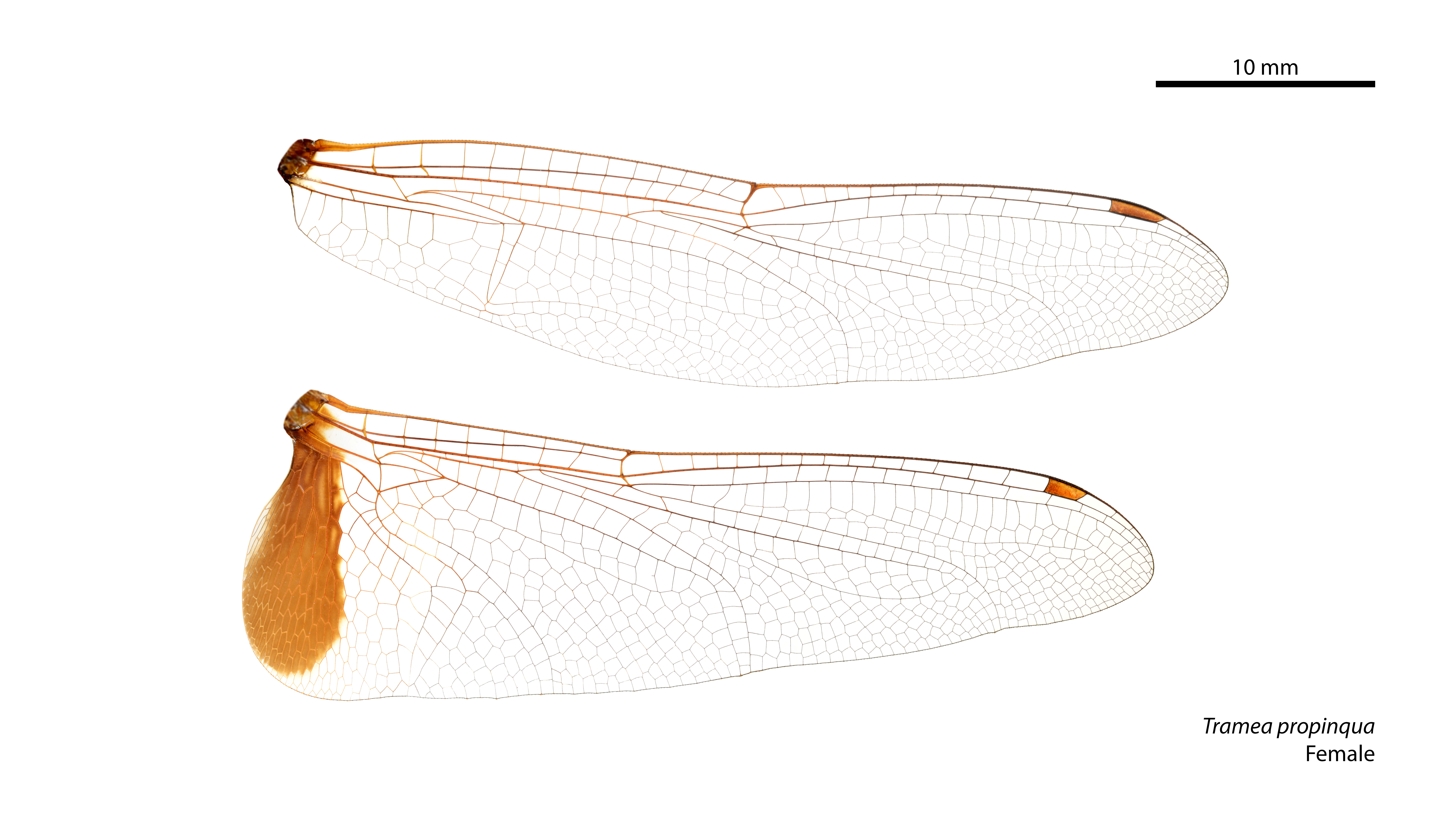
Female Tramea transmarina wings

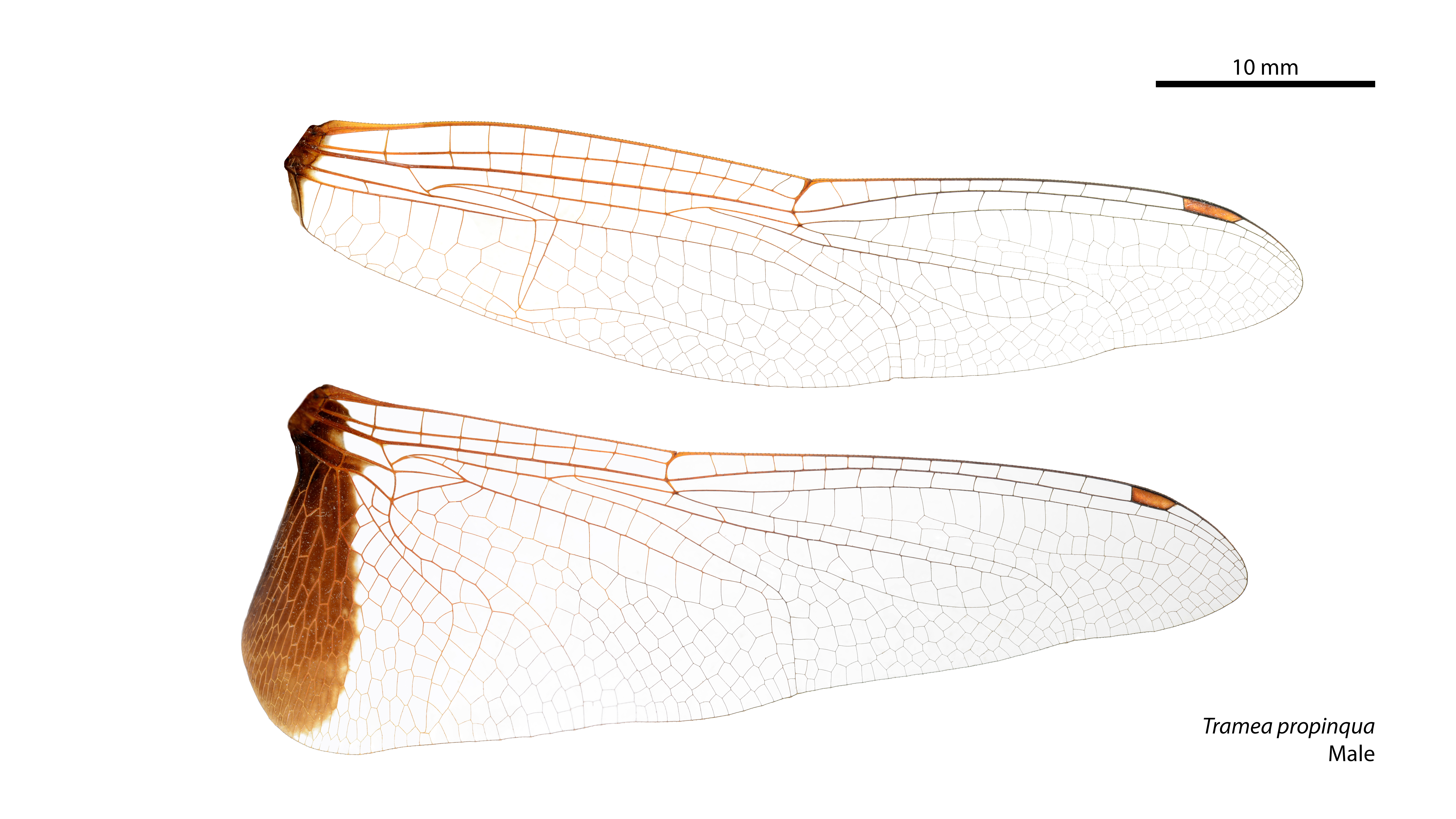
Male Tramea transmarina wings
