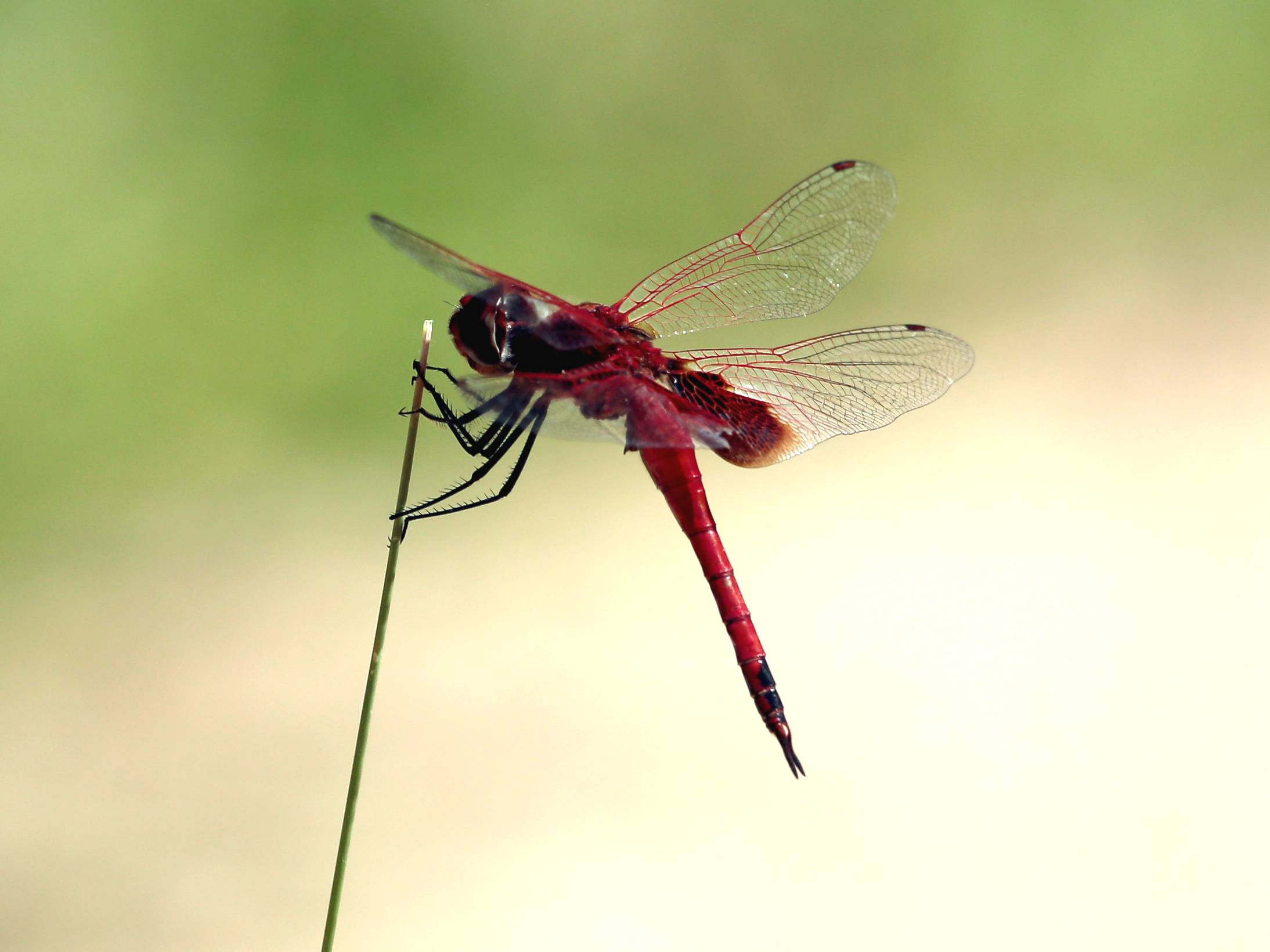
- Male narrow-lobed glider in Cairns, Australia

Conservation status
- Least Concern (IUCN 3.1)

Scientific classification
- Kingdom: Animalia
- Phylum: Arthropoda
- Clade: Pancrustacea
- Class: Insecta
- Order: Odonata
- Infraorder: Anisoptera
- Family: Libellulidae
- Genus: Tramea
- Species: T. stenoloba

Binomial name
- Tramea stenoloba (Watson, 1962)

Synonyms
- Trapezostigma stenoloba Watson, 1962

= Tramea stenoloba =

Narrow-lobed glider

Species of dragonfly

Tramea stenoloba, commonly known as the narrow-lobed glider, is a species of dragonfly in the family Libellulidae.

It occurs in the Cocos Islands, Lesser Sunda Islands, the Java Sea region and Australia. In Australia it is widespread except for the far south-east of the continent.

Tramea stenoloba is a medium to large dragonfly with a predominantly red thorax, dark patches at the base of the hindwings, and a red abdomen with black terminal segments. Females are duller brown.

== Taxonomic history ==
In 1962, Watson established Trapezostigma stenoloba as a new species from material collected in Western Australia.

In 1967, Watson reviewed Indo-Australian species of the Trapezostigma eurybia group, providing a detailed analysis of Trapezostigma stenoloba and its relationships with related species including Trapezostigma eurybia and Trapezostigma loewii.

The genus Trapezostigma is now treated as a synonym of Tramea.

== Description ==
Tramea stenoloba is similar in appearance to Tramea loewii, but differs in the colouration of the thorax and the structure of the male secondary genitalia.

The thorax is almost uniformly red, with only limited dark markings along the sutures. The dark patch at the base of the hindwing is usually conspicuous. In males, the genital lobe is long and narrow, a feature reflected in the species name stenoloba.

== Distribution and habitat ==
Tramea stenoloba inhabits riverine lagoons, lakes and ponds, including temporary ponds.

== Etymology ==
The genus name Tramea is derived from the Latin trameare ("to pass through" or "travel across"), referring to the migratory or vagrant behaviour of species in the genus.

The former genus name Trapezostigma is derived from the Greek τραπέζιον (trapezion, "trapezium") and στίγμα (stigma, "spot" or "mark"), likely referring to the shape of the pterostigma.

The species name stenoloba is derived from the Greek στενός (stenos, "narrow") and λοβός (lobos, "lobe"), referring to the narrow lobe of the male secondary genitalia.

== Gallery ==
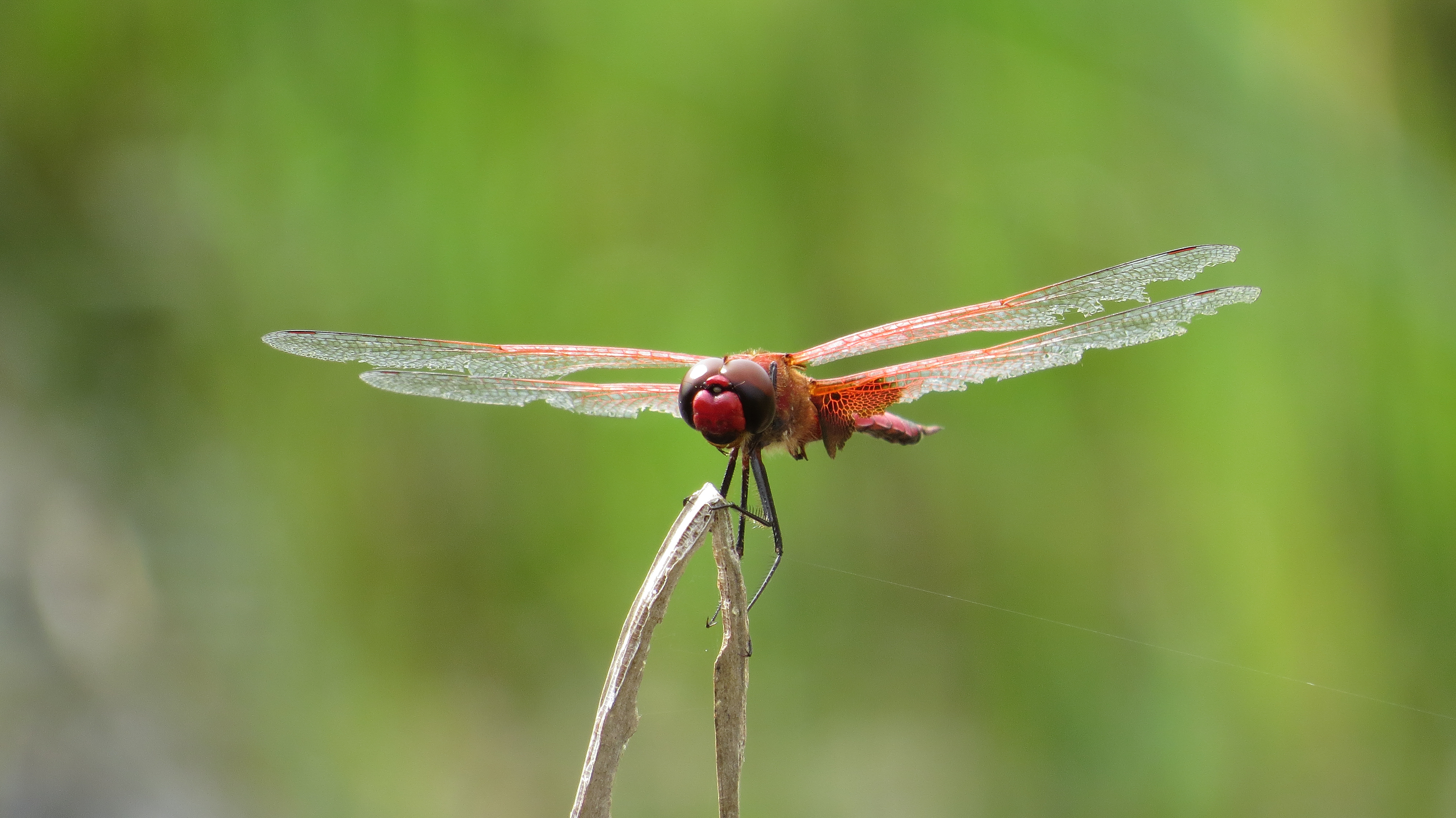
Male with tatty wings

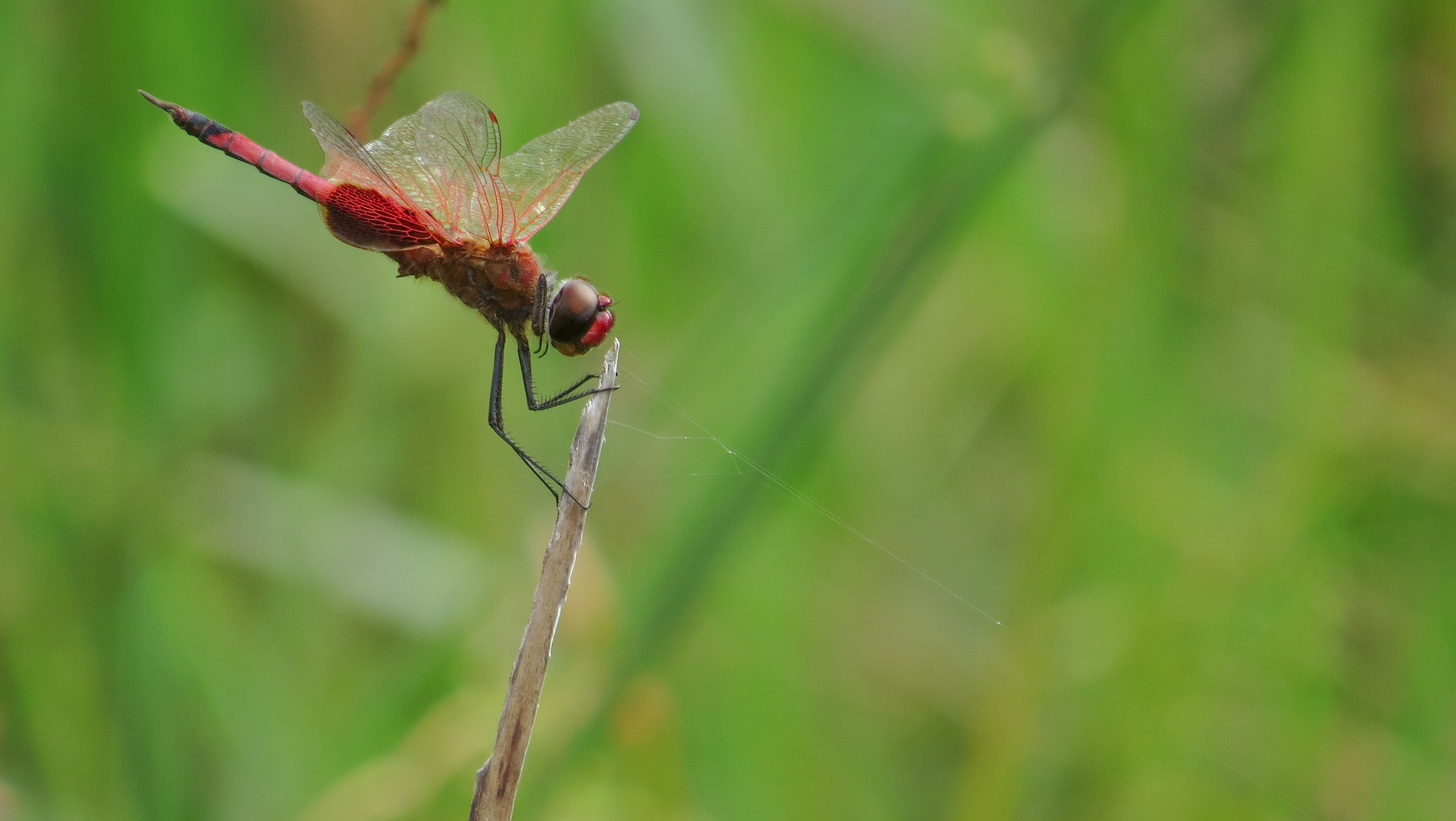
Male side view

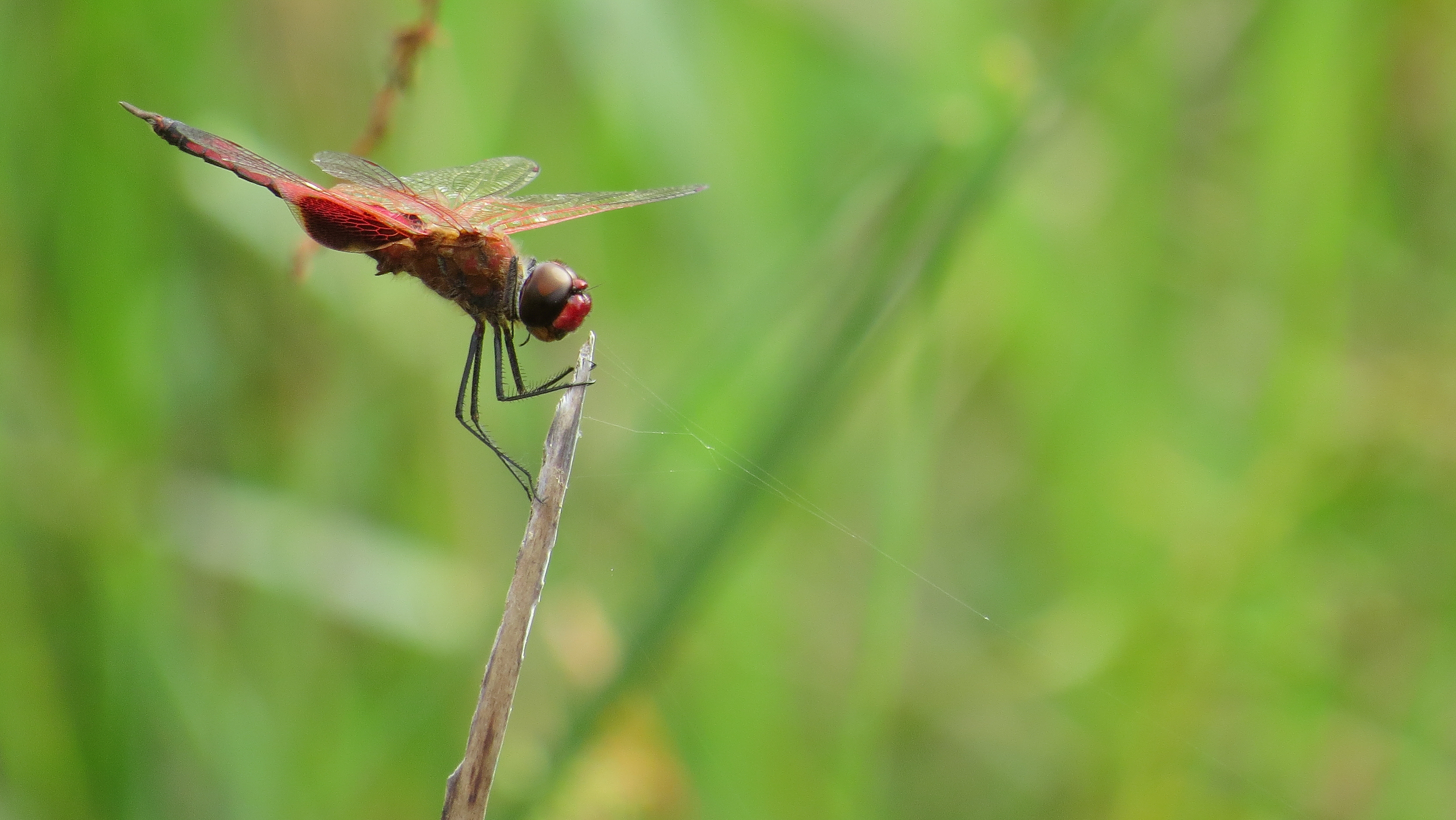
Male

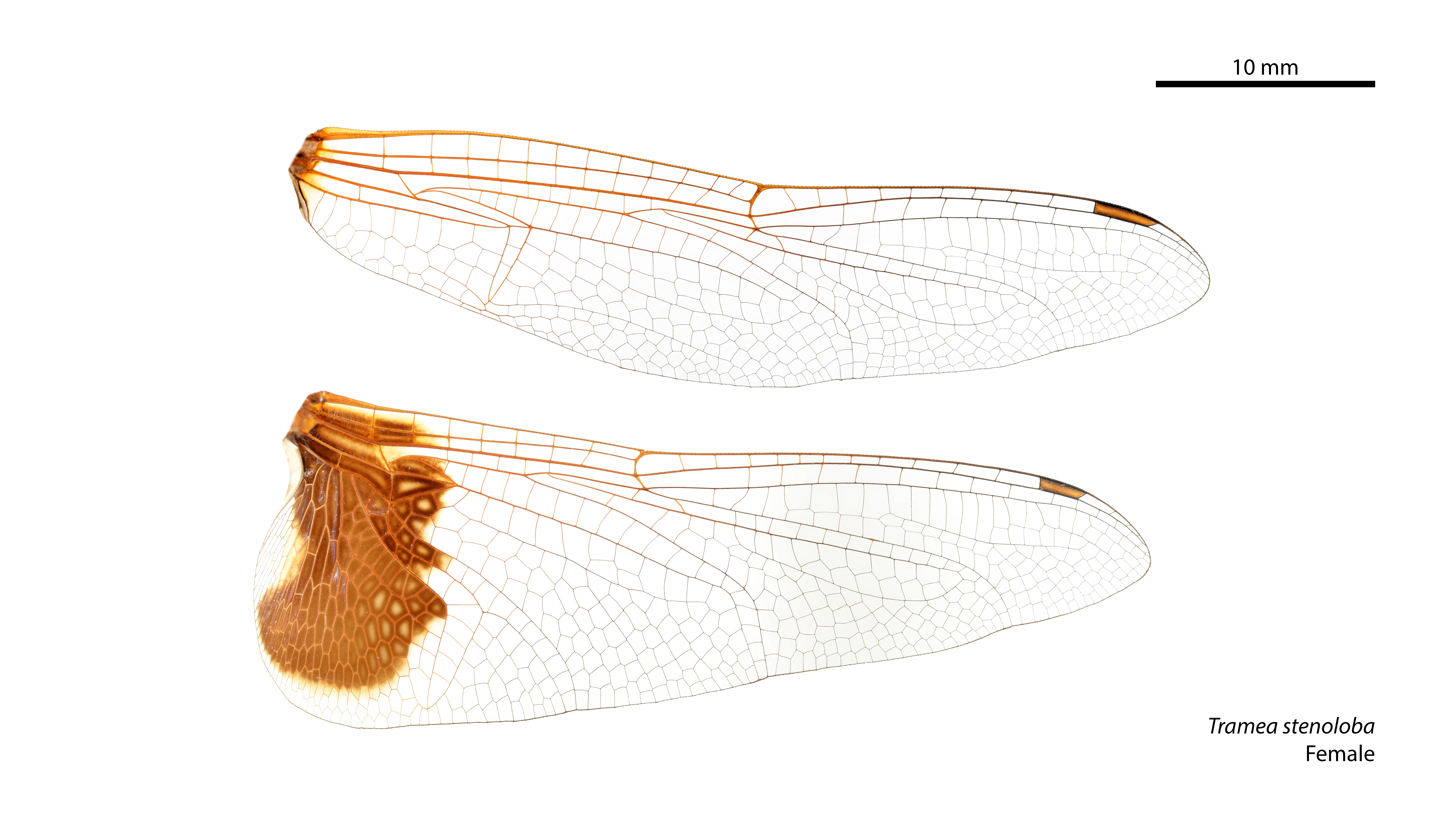
Female wings

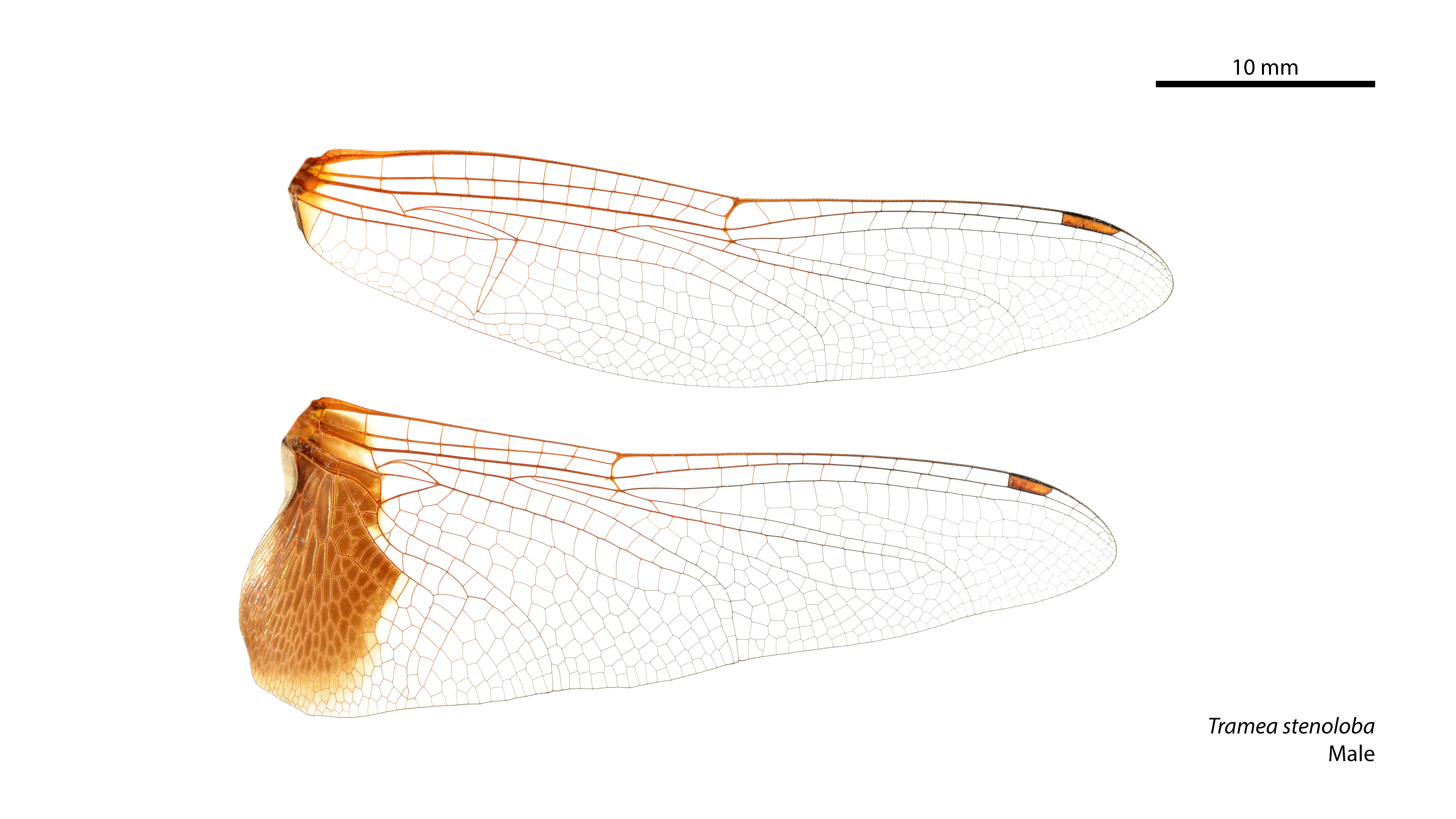
Male wings
