= List of companies based in Leeds City Region =

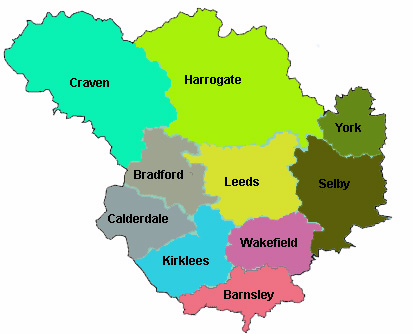

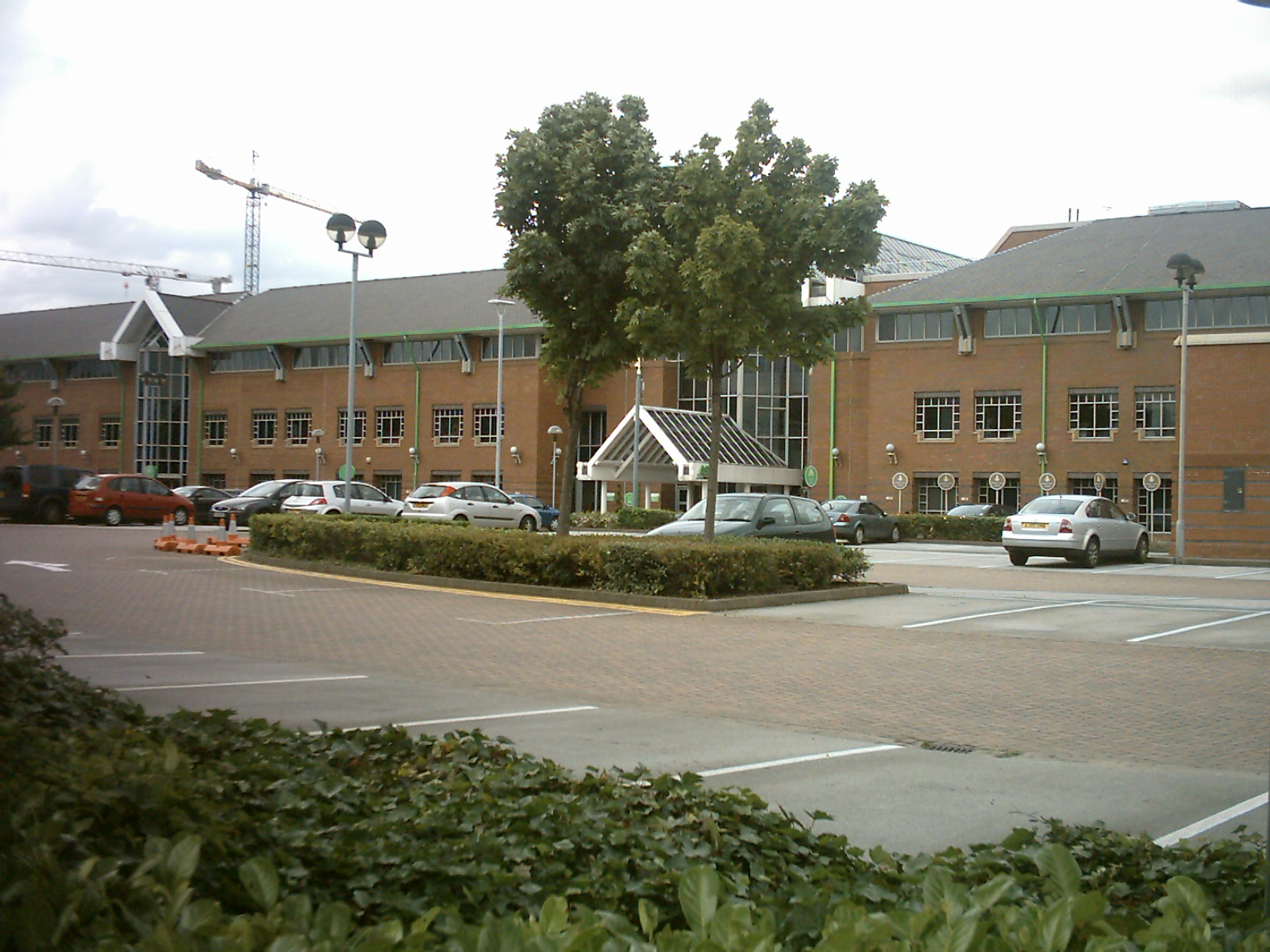
Asda's Headquarters, Asda House in Leeds

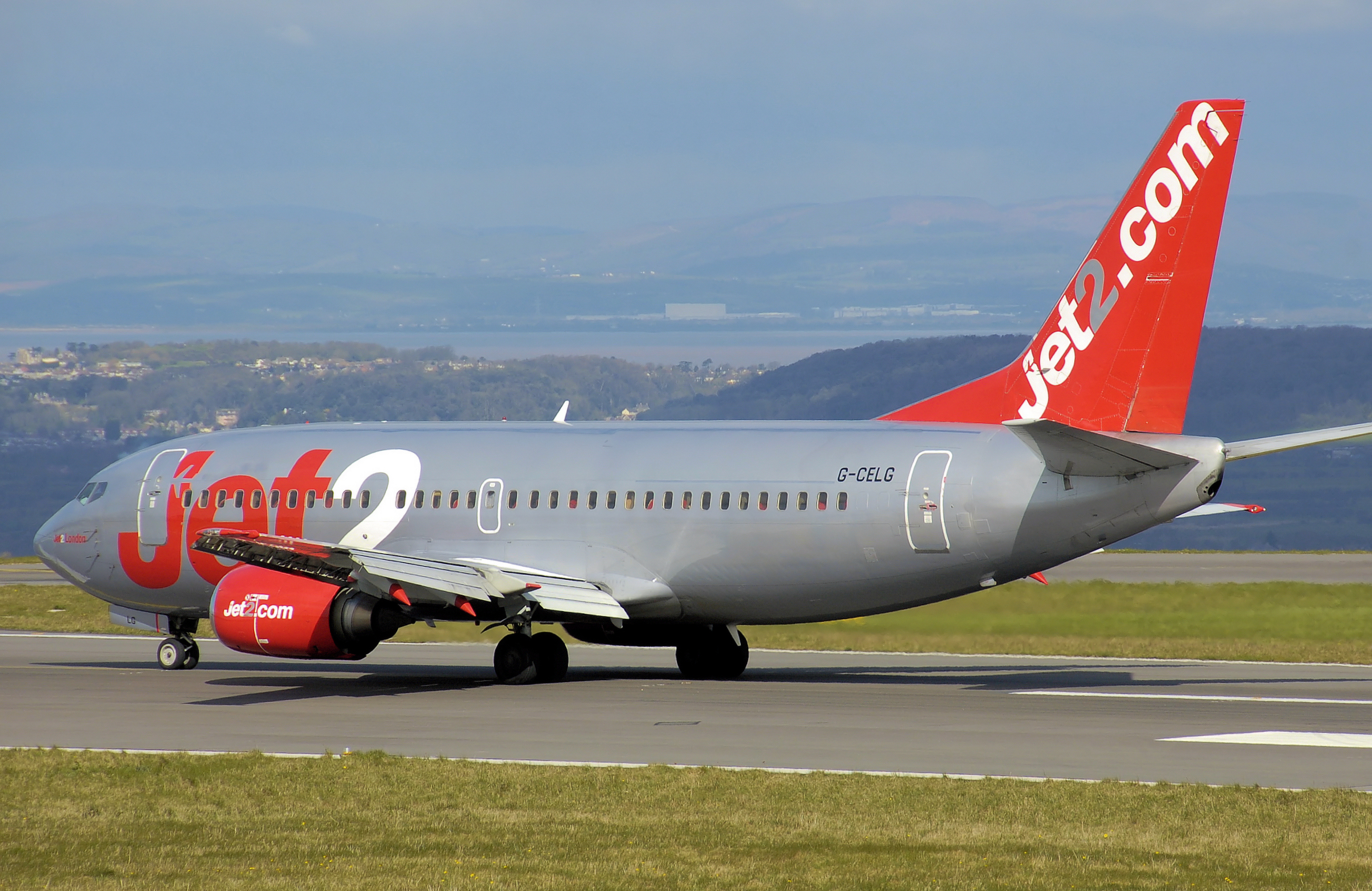
Jet2 Boeing 737-300

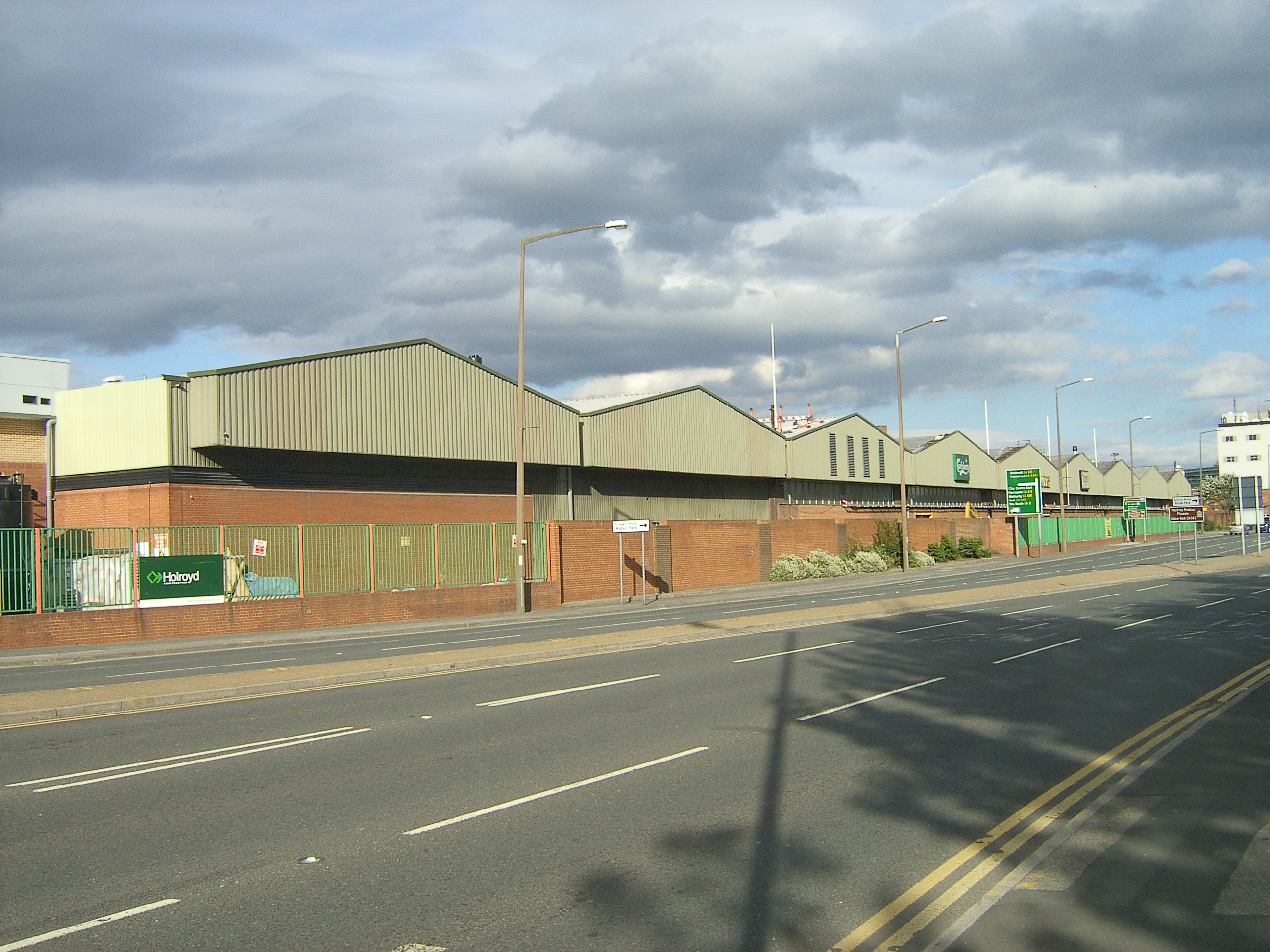
Tetley's Brewery

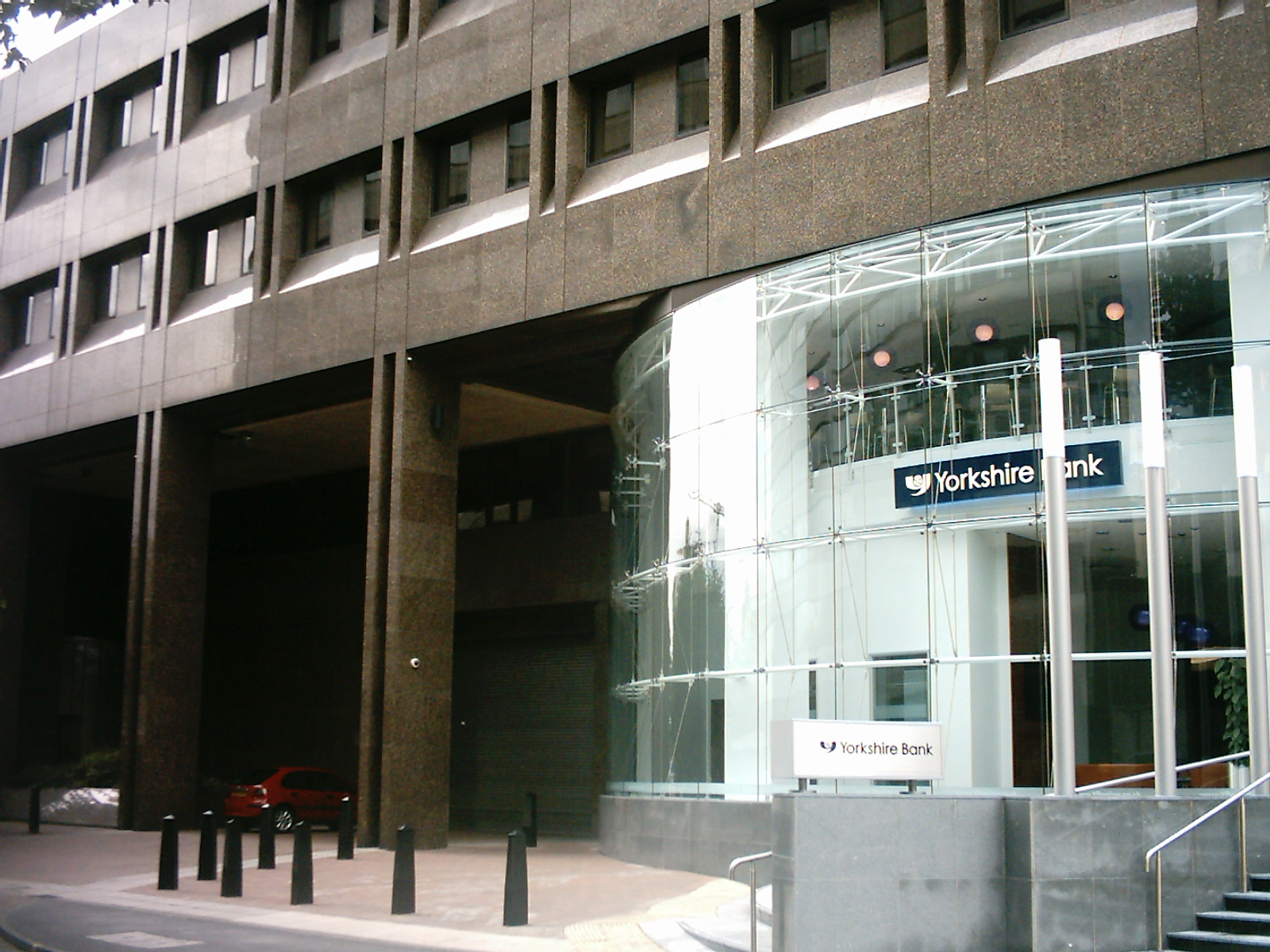
The Yorkshire Bank headquarters in Leeds

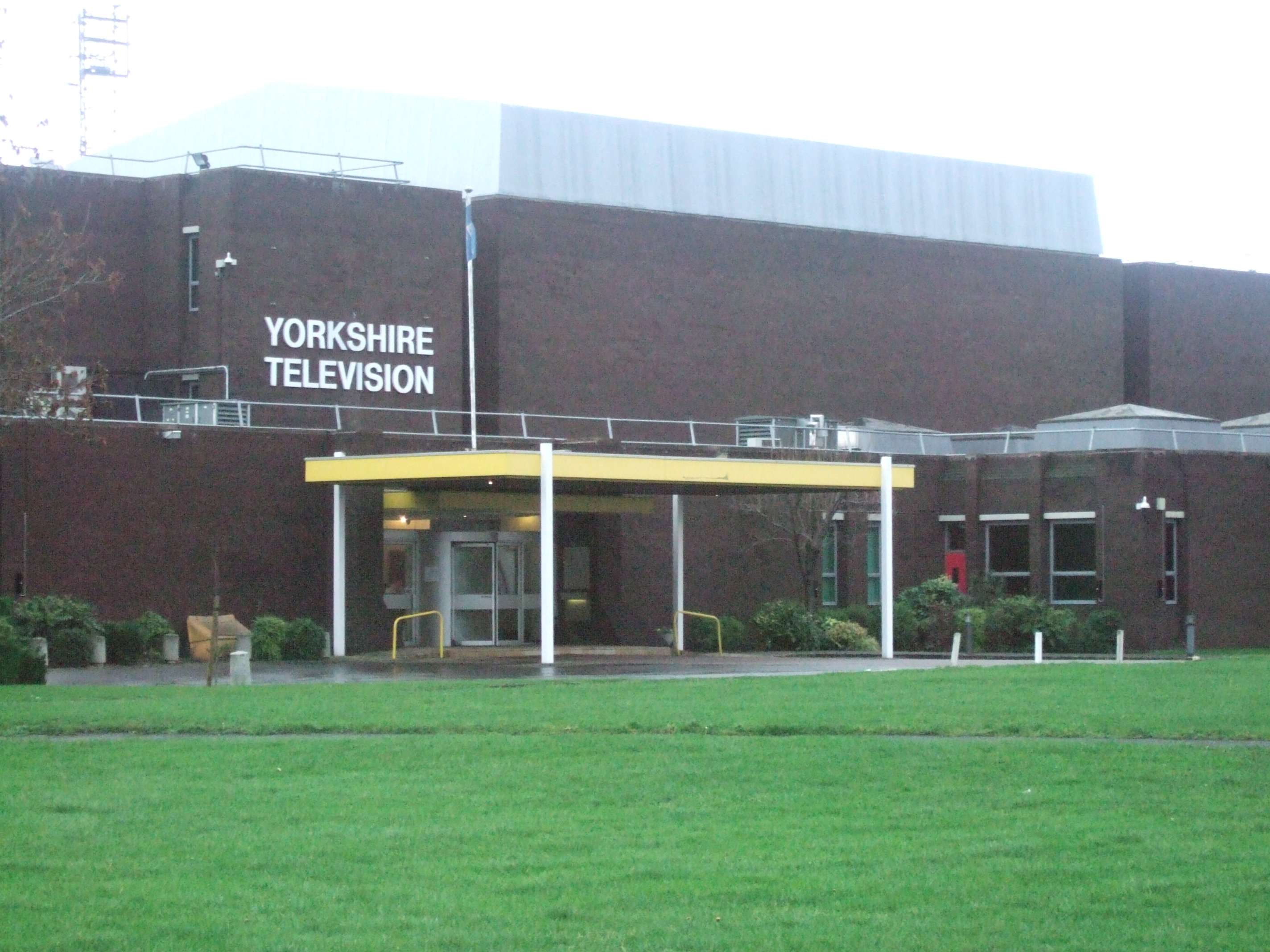
The Leeds Studios operated by Yorkshire Television

The Leeds City Region is home to various companies which operate in the United Kingdom or further afield in Europe and around the world. The Leeds City Region economy is centred on the city of Leeds, with other notable local economies of Bradford, Wakefield, Huddersfield and areas outside West Yorkshire such as Harrogate.

== List of companies ==
- Airedale International Air Conditioning – British manufacturer and worldwide distributor of cooling, heating and HVAC systems.
- Arla Foods - UK subsidiary of this Danish company
- Asda - One of the "big four" UK supermarket chains.
- aql - telecoms company and data centre operator
- Buckley London - designer costume jewellery
- Capita - FTSE 100 listed company concerned with business process outsourcing
- Channel 4 - Television relocated its headquarters to Leeds from London in 2021.
- Crisp Thinking - AI-based technology company focused on detecting social media risk for global brands and protecting children online
- Conservative Party HQ - Began relocation to Leeds in 2020.
- First Direct - a subsidiary of HSBC
- GHD - global HQ for hair fashion company
- Jet2.com - low cost airline
- Leeds Brewery
- Leeds Building Society - formerly known as Leeds and Holbeck Building Society
- Labcorp - clinical Research Unit for S&P 500 company, to complete in 2022 at Leeds South Bank.
- Northern Gas Networks - natural gas distributor and network
- Northern Foods - ready meals and food brands
- PwC - Big four accounting firm.
- Rockstar Leeds
- Sky Group - customer care and digital development
- Sky Betting & Gaming - betting and gaming company has headquarters in Leeds
- Yorkshire Post Newspapers - a subsidiary of Johnston Press
- Yorkshire Television - a subsidiary of ITV

== Companies formerly headquartered in Leeds ==
- Burton - a tailor currently owned by the Arcadia Group, which is headquartered in London
- J Hepworth & Son - formerly a tailor; renamed Next in the 1980s; now based in Enderby, Leicestershire
- J&H McLaren & Co. - steam traction and diesel engine manufacturers; taken over by Hawker Siddeley; shut down in 1959
- John Fowler & Co. - steam traction and ploughing engine manufacturers; taken over by Marshall, Sons & Co.
- Kitson & Co. - former locomotive builders; failed in the 1930s; remains sold to Robert Stephenson and Hawthorns
- Leeds Permanent Building Society - also known as The Leeds; in 1995 it was bought by the Halifax, which in turn merged with Bank of Scotland; however, there continues to be a significant HBOS office presence in the city of Leeds
- Marks & Spencer - founded in Leeds Kirkgate Market as a penny bazaar, it has long since been headquartered in London
- Planet Online - latterly known as Energis Squared; business ISP bought by Energis and now part of Cable & Wireless
- Premier Farnell - electronic component distributor worldwide (HQ now in London)
- Republic - clothing store
- Schofields - a department store on The Headrow in Leeds; bought by House of Fraser in 1988 and latterly closed in 1996
- Systime Computers Ltd – computer manufacturer founded in 1973, became second-largest such firm in Britain; acquired and broken up during the mid-late 1980s
- Tetley - taken over by Carlsberg UK, based in Northampton
- Thurstons - a bakers and sandwich retailer; taken over by Greggs in the 1990s and subsequently rebranded as Greggs
- Visionware – software company split out from Systime Computers in 1989 that made client-server connectivity products; bought by the Santa Cruz Operation in 1994
- Waddingtons - a maker of board games; taken over by the American toy company Hasbro; has since had production of board games moved out of the city

== See also ==
- Economy of Leeds
