= UIMX =

In computer software, UIM/X or UIMX, the User Interface Management System for X Window, is an interface builder for Motif originally developed by Visual Edge Software (later renamed to Actional Corporation). UIM/X supports object oriented GUI building in C and C++ for the major Unix platforms Solaris, HP-UX, AIX and IRIX (now discontinued), and, in its latest releases, Linux. UIM/X was purchased in 2005 from Bluestone Consulting, and now supported by Integrated Computer Solutions.
