= IRIX Interactive Desktop =

Computer software desktop environment

IRIX Interactive Desktop (formerly "Indigo Magic Desktop")
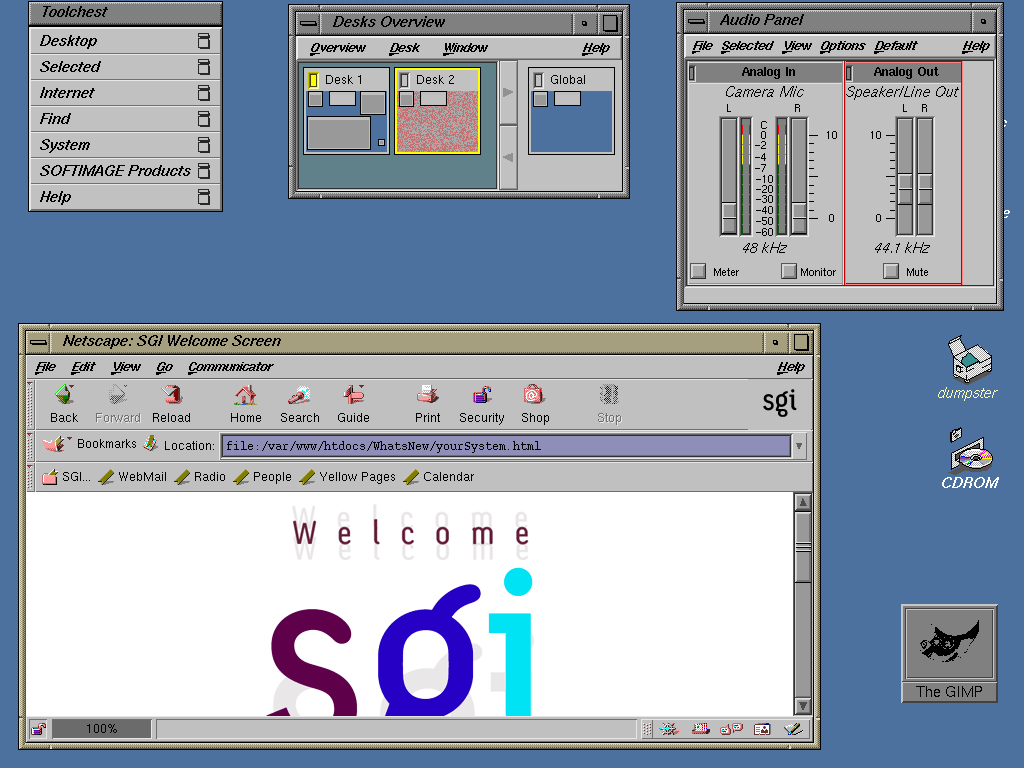
- The IRIX Interactive Desktop running Netscape Navigator
- Developer: Silicon Graphics
- Initial release: September 1993; 32 years ago
- Operating system: IRIX
- Type: desktop environment
- Website: sgi.com

IRIX Interactive Desktop (formerly called Indigo Magic Desktop) is a discontinued desktop environment normally used as the default desktop on Silicon Graphics workstations running IRIX. The IRIX Interactive Desktop uses the Motif widget toolkit on top of the X Window System found on most Unix systems. The default window manager on the IRIX Interactive Desktop is 4Dwm.

== History ==
IRIS Workspace is SGI's first desktop environment in IRIX versions 3.0 through 5.0. This was succeeded by Indigo Magic Desktop, introduced in 1993 with IRIX 5.1 on the Indy multimedia workstation. Along with Sun Microsystem's former OpenWindows environment and the Common Desktop Environment from COSE released the same year, these were some of the first desktop environments to be provided by default on a Unix computer system.

The Indigo Magic Desktop was renamed to IRIX Interactive Desktop with the release of IRIX 6.5 in 1998.

== Features ==
Indigo Magic Desktop is intended to promote easy access to multimedia functionality, and provide user-customizable environments. The environment is based on audio cues for the start and finish of an operation, intelligent windows to track recently visited directories, and multiple virtual desktops grouped by function.

IRIX Interactive Desktop has two primary components: the System Manager and the Toolchest. The System Manager is the main utility for desktop and system configuration. The Toolchest is a menu (normally located on the desktop) that shows which applications are installed on a particular Silicon Graphics workstation. When not in use, program windows minimize onto the desktop in a small rectangular shape, while the file manager that also displays the desktop uses a distinct vector graphic icons (utilizing the IconSmith .fti file format).

== Reception ==
UNIX Review magazine in March 1994 gave Indigo Magic Desktop a mixed review, with an overall rating of "superior".

== See also ==
- IRIS Workspace
- MEX
- Xsgi
