= Paul Haeberli =

American computer programmer

- Born: Paul E. Haeberli; United States
- Education: University of Wisconsin–Madison (Bachelor of Science degree in electrical engineering)
- Occupation: Software engineer
- Employer(s): Silicon Graphics; Shutterfly; Lamina Design
- Known for: Silicon Graphics Image format

Paul E. Haeberli is an American computer graphics programmer and researcher.

== Biography ==
Paul Haeberli studied for a Bachelor of Science degree in electrical engineering at the University of Wisconsin–Madison, United States.

TIFF test file by Paul Haeberli

Haeberli was recruited by James H. Clark to join Silicon Graphics during the company's founding. Haeberli's early work included code developed with David J. Brown and Mark Grossman for SGI's first product – the IRIS 1000. Between 1983 and 1999, Haeberli continued at Silicon Graphics in Silicon Valley, California. He worked on the early MEX window system for Silicon Graphics workstations. He was also involved in non-photorealistic rendering (NPR) techniques in computer graphics, producing software to implement this approach. He devised the Silicon Graphics Image (SGI) format for graphics files. Later, he became an initial member of the research team at Silicon Graphics.

After Silicon Graphics, Haeberli joined Shutterfly, where he developed much of the online technology and image-processing foundations for the system that Shutterfly later employed in production.

Subsequently, he founded Lamina Design, which allows freeform structures to be constructed from sheet material using computer-based techniques. The company is based in Madison, Wisconsin.

== Contributions ==
Haeberli holds a number of patents related to computer graphics. He has contributed to several GitHub projects. He has curated a number of computer graphics techniques online. He also has a number of highly cited papers, including:

- Devereux, John; Haeberli, Paul; Smithies, Oliver (January 1984). "A comprehensive set of sequence analysis programs for the VAX". Nucleic Acids Research. 12 (1 Part 1): 387–395. doi:10.1093/nar/12.1Part1.387. PMC 321012.
- Haeberli, Paul E. (June 1988). "ConMan: A visual programming language for interactive graphics". SIGGRAPH '88: Proceedings of the 15th Annual Conference on Computer Graphics and Interactive Techniques: 103–111. doi:10.1145/54852.378494.
- Haeberli, Paul (September 1990). "Paint by numbers: Abstract image representations". SIGGRAPH '90: Proceedings of the 17th Annual Conference on Computer Graphics and Interactive Techniques: 207–214. doi:10.1145/97879.97902.
- Hanrahan, Pat; Haeberli, Paul (September 1990). "Direct WYSIWYG painting and texturing on 3D shapes". ACM SIGGRAPH Computer Graphics. 24 (4): 215–223. doi:10.1145/97880.97903.
- Haeberli, Paul; Akeley, Kurt (September 1990). "The accumulation buffer: Hardware support for high-quality rendering". ACM SIGGRAPH Computer Graphics. 24 (4): 309–318. doi:10.1145/97880.97913.
- Segal, Mark; Korobkin, Carl; van Widenfelt, Rolf; Foran, Jim; Haeberli, Paul (July 1992). "Fast shadows and lighting effects using texture mapping". SIGGRAPH '92: Proceedings of the 19th Annual Conference on Computer Graphics and Interactive Techniques. 26: 249–252. doi:10.1145/133994.134071.
- Haeberli, Paul; Segal, Mark (June 1993). "Texture mapping as a fundamental drawing primitive". Fourth Eurographics Workshop on Rendering.
