= Plan (disambiguation) =

A plan is a set of instructions for attaining a given objective.

Plan or PLAN or planning may also refer to:

- Planning, the organizational process of creating and maintaining a plan
- Planning (cognitive), neurological processes involved in achieving a desired goal

== Plan types ==
- Automated planning and scheduling, a branch of Artificial Intelligence
- Business plan
- Development plan
- Language planning
- Marketing plan
- Military plan
- Plans (drawings), used for portraying an existing place or object, or for providing instructions to build or fabricate a place or object
  - Archaeological plan
  - Architectural drawing
  - Architectural plan
  - Blueprint
  - Engineering drawing
  - Floor plan
  - Plan view, an orthographic projection
  - Plat
  - Technical drawing
- Project planning
- Retirement plan
- Urban planning

== Acronyms ==
- PLAN (examination), a standardized test administered by ACT, Inc.
- People's Liberation Army Navy of the People's Republic of China
- People's Liberation Army of Namibia
- Personal Localized Alerting Network, an emergency alert system that uses mobile devices
- PLANS (non-profit) (People for Legal and Non-Sectarian Schools)

== Entertainment ==
- Plan (film), a 2004 Bollywood film
- Plans (album), an album by the band Death Cab for Cutie
- "Plans", a song by Bloc Party from Silent Alarm, 2005
- "Plans" (Birds of Tokyo song), 2010
- "Plans" (Brandon Lake song), 2025
- "Plans" (Brandon Flowers song), 2026
- "iPlan", a 2023 song by Dlala Thukzin

== Places ==
- Plan (Huesca), a municipality in Spain
- Plan, Isère, a commune in France
- Planá (German: Plan), a town in the Czech Republic
- Planá (České Budějovice District) (German: Plan), a municipality and village in the Czech Republic

== Politics ==
- Plans in Mexican history, a declaration of principles announced in conjunction with a rebellion (see also pronunciamiento)

== Technology ==
- .plan file, a file containing user information used by the Finger protocol
- Calligra Plan, a project management application
- Plan (calendar program), for the X Window System
- PLAN (computer language) (Programming LAnguage for Nineteen-hundred), used to program ICT 1900 series computers

== Other uses ==
- Plan (aid organisation), an international organisation that allows people to sponsor children in developing countries
- Plan (magazine), an Irish architectural publication
- Slang for planning permission

== See also ==
- Five-year plan (disambiguation)
- Four Year Plan, a series of economic reforms in Nazi Germany
- PDCA (Plan-do-check-act), a management method used in business
- Planner (disambiguation)
- The Plan (disambiguation)
