= Systime Computers =

British computer manufacturer

Systime Computers Ltd
- Industry: Computer hardware, systems integration, computer software
- Founded: October 1973; 53 years ago
- Founder: John Gow
- Defunct: June 1989; 37 years ago
- Fate: acquired by Control Data Corporation in April 1985; half of subsidiary acquired by Digital Equipment Corporation in February 1986; remaining parts of subsidiary broken up in June 1989
- Headquarters: Leeds, England, United Kingdom
- Key people: John Gow (managing director); John Parkinson (board chair); Ian Fallows (technical director; Ian McNeill (technical director)
- Products: Systime 1000, 3000, 5000; Systime 8750, 8780; Systel; Series 2, 3; PC-Connect
- Revenue: £60 million (ca. 1984)
- Number of employees: 1,370 (1983)

Systime Computers Ltd was a British computer manufacturer and systems integrator of the 1970s and 1980s. During the late 1970s and early 1980s, Systime became the second-largest British manufacturer of computers, specialising in the minicomputer market.

The company was based in Leeds, England, and founded in 1973. Its success was based on selling systems built around OEM components from Digital Equipment Corporation (DEC), and it grew to have over 1,300 employees with turnover peaking around £60 million. Systime was unusual among systems integrators in that it actually manufactured the hardware it sold to customers.

A portion of Systime was purchased in 1983 by Control Data Corporation and the company's founder departed. Systime Computers then went through a period of sharp decline, in part due to lawsuits from DEC for intellectual property infringement, and even more so due to charges of violating Cold War-era U.S. export restrictions regarding indirect sales to Eastern Bloc countries.

In 1985, what was left of Systime was fully acquired by Control Data Corporation, and a year later the DEC-related services part of that subsidiary was bought by DEC. Systime then focused on selling products built by its own engineers. The Systime–Control Data arrangement did not prosper, and in 1989 Control Data split Systime into four companies, each sold to a management buyout.

== Origins of company ==
John Gow was a mechanical engineering graduate of the University of Leeds who had gone into computer programming and then became a software support manager at a Lancashire office of the British subsidiary of Digital Equipment Corporation (DEC). He also did some hardware sales work and realised that few of the customers to whom he was selling actually understood the capabilities of the computers they were buying. In 1972, Gow, then 27 years old, and three others set up a partnership on their own, labouring in Gow's bungalow workshop.

Systime Computers Ltd was created the following year, being incorporated in October 1973. Gow and the three others moved their work into the canteen of an abandoned mill in Leeds.

Due to inadequate capitalisation – £2,800, in a field in which the minicomputers they would be selling cost £60,000 each – the new company had a shaky start and came close to going under right away. The key turning point was engaging with Leeds-based jukebox firm Musichire, which had purchased a computer from DEC but were struggling with it. Systime came in on a consulting basis and sold Musichire both software and new hardware. John Parkinson, financial director of Musichire, was sufficiently impressed with Gow's sales abilities that, in 1974, Musichire took a financial stake in Systime. Parkinson subsequently became chair of the board of directors of Systime.

== Period of rapidly increasing growth ==
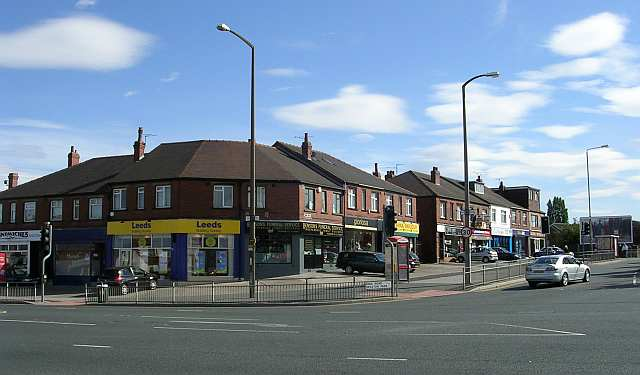
The initial Systime facility was in former mills off Dewsbury Road in the Beeston area of Leeds (a couple of blocks further left of what is seen here in 2007)

Gow emphasised that Systime would provide not just hardware but also software applications, systems engineering, and support. By 1975, Systime had £2.75 million in turnover and profits of £300,000 and was already opening offices and subsidiaries overseas.

Musichire's stake in the company impeded the company's ability to grow. Gow engaged with financiers but did not like them and did not want to accept investment from either the Industrial and Commercial Finance Corporation or from merchant banks, fearing they would demand too much control of the company's direction. However, in 1977 Gow arranged for investment firm Ivory and Sime to buy out Musichire's share. Around the same time, the National Enterprise Board (NEB) convinced Gow to sign up with them; they invested £500,000 in Systime in return for a 26 per cent stake in the young firm (which would in time grow to near 30 per cent.) The NEB also facilitated the participation of Systime in a new marketing effort in an NEB subsidiary known as Insac Data Systems, which would promote exports of British technology products.

Systime's business model was selling products centred around computers originally built by DEC in the United States. They would take actual DEC components and put them together with items such as power supplies and storage cables that they built themselves or obtained from other industry sources. To this base of equipment, Systime added peripherals and software from other vendors and then added some of its own application software. This allowed Systime to provide full solutions to growing customers, such as Gordon Spice Cash and Carry, that were first embracing computerised line-of-business systems during the 1970s.

Accordingly, the Systime product lines were based around the minicomputers they produced, the most popular of which were the Systime 1000, Systime 3000, and Systime 5000, all based on different models of the DEC 16-bit PDP-11 minicomputer (roughly, the PDP-11/04, /60, and /34 respectively). The PDP-11-based Systime systems would typically run the DEC's RSTS/E operating system. These systems had many kinds of users; for instance, a botany group at the University of Reading used a Systime 5000.

Systime's use of the PDP-11 coincided with an upsurge in the popularity of that model within the computer-using community, one that DEC had not fully anticipated, leading to wait times up to three years for systems or components. As a result, Systime began manufacturing its own DEC-compatible memory boards and storage devices.

Later, the Systime 8000 series came out, which were based upon the DEC 32-bit VAX-11 supermini. The 8000 series had names that indicated the DEC model they were derived from, so the Systime 8750 was equivalent to the VAX-11/750 and the Systime 8780 was equivalent to the VAX-11/780. The Systime 8000 series systems could run DEC's VMS operating system, but many of them were instead running one variant or another of Unix. This was another successful product; by the mid-1980s around one-third of all VAXen in the United Kingdom were Systime-based systems.

A pure software product was Systel, the Systime Teleprocessing System, which acted as a transaction processing system with data dictionary-based programming assist features. As such it was a competitor to products such as TAPS from Informatics General on the PDP-11, but in 1980–81 Systime saw an opening on the VAX-11 where there were no rival teleprocessing monitors yet. Systel development was half-funded by the Insac arrangement and that entity received royalties on Systel sales. Systime had some success with Systel in the United Kingdom and Holland and made a push to sell it in the United States as well.

Ian Fallows was technical director of the company during the 1970s. Systime was rapidly hiring not just hardware engineers but also software engineers to work on operating systems, controllers, and telecommunications and networking components.

In 1980, Systime had turnover of £24.6 million and a profit of £1.6 million. Those figures increased to £32.1 million and £2.2 million in 1981, respectively. By then, Systime had some 1,150 employees and eleven offices around the United Kingdom. Systime was one of four companies short-listed for the Institute of Directors's annual Business Enterprise Award for 1981. It was an unusual case of a British company succeeding in making minicomputers, a market dominated by American firms. Despite its successes and fast growth, Systime was little known to the general public.

== New facility and changes of management ==
Princess Anne officially opened Systime's new £20 million facility on 27 June 1983. Founder and managing director John Gow is alongside her.

In September 1981, Gow announced an ambitious three-year, £46 million expansion plan for Systime, including the building of a second large facility in Leeds, with some of the funding to come from the European Investment Bank and various government grants. The second facility was to enter the microcomputer business for small businesses and, in a first for Systime, would not rely upon DEC components. This reflected that Systime was in the process of manufacturing not just minicomputers but also desktop systems, as well as terminals and printers, most of which were targeted to the Western European market. Systime also ran a service bureau, that offered the creation of application software and that sold maintenance contracts on a third-party basis. In all, Systime's plans anticipated a doubling of its employee count.

By 1983, Systime was considered, as The Times wrote, "one of the largest and fastest-growing British computer companies". It was the second largest computer manufacturer based in Britain, behind only the mainframe-oriented International Computers Limited (ICL). Ian McNeill was technical director of the company during this period. In addition, Systime was considered an exemplar of new industrial potential in Northern England, and the company was often visited by government ministers as a result.

However, the switch from the National Enterprise Board to the successor British Technology Group (BTG) left Systime with uncertain funding while it was in the process of its big expansion; as Gow subsequently said, "we were sailing along and suddenly started to get really tight on cash. We'd outgrown our resources." Gow had previously considered organising a flotation but now did not have time to do so, so he sought investments from other British companies, but they all wanted to stage a full acquisition. In particular, there were meetings in January 1983 with two large British technology companies, Ferranti and Standard Telephones and Cables (STC), that did not achieve fruition.

Instead, in March 1983, it was announced that Control Data Corporation was buying 38 per cent of Systime for £8 million, with another 25 per cent to be controlled by Ivory and Sime. At the same time, BTG reduced its investment down to 12 per cent. The two companies had had existing business dealings, as Systime bought many Control Data peripheral devices to include in its full systems. The recapitalisation of Systime was completed in June 1983. At this point, Parkinson departed as chair of Systime and retired from the industry altogether for a while.

The new facility, built for £20 million in a nearby area of Beeston, Leeds, had begun operations in October 1982, with computer production taking place there. The facility was formally opened on 27 June 1983 by Princess Anne. The large building featured what one newspaper termed "a distinctive reflective glass front"; more popularly it became known as the "Glass Palace".

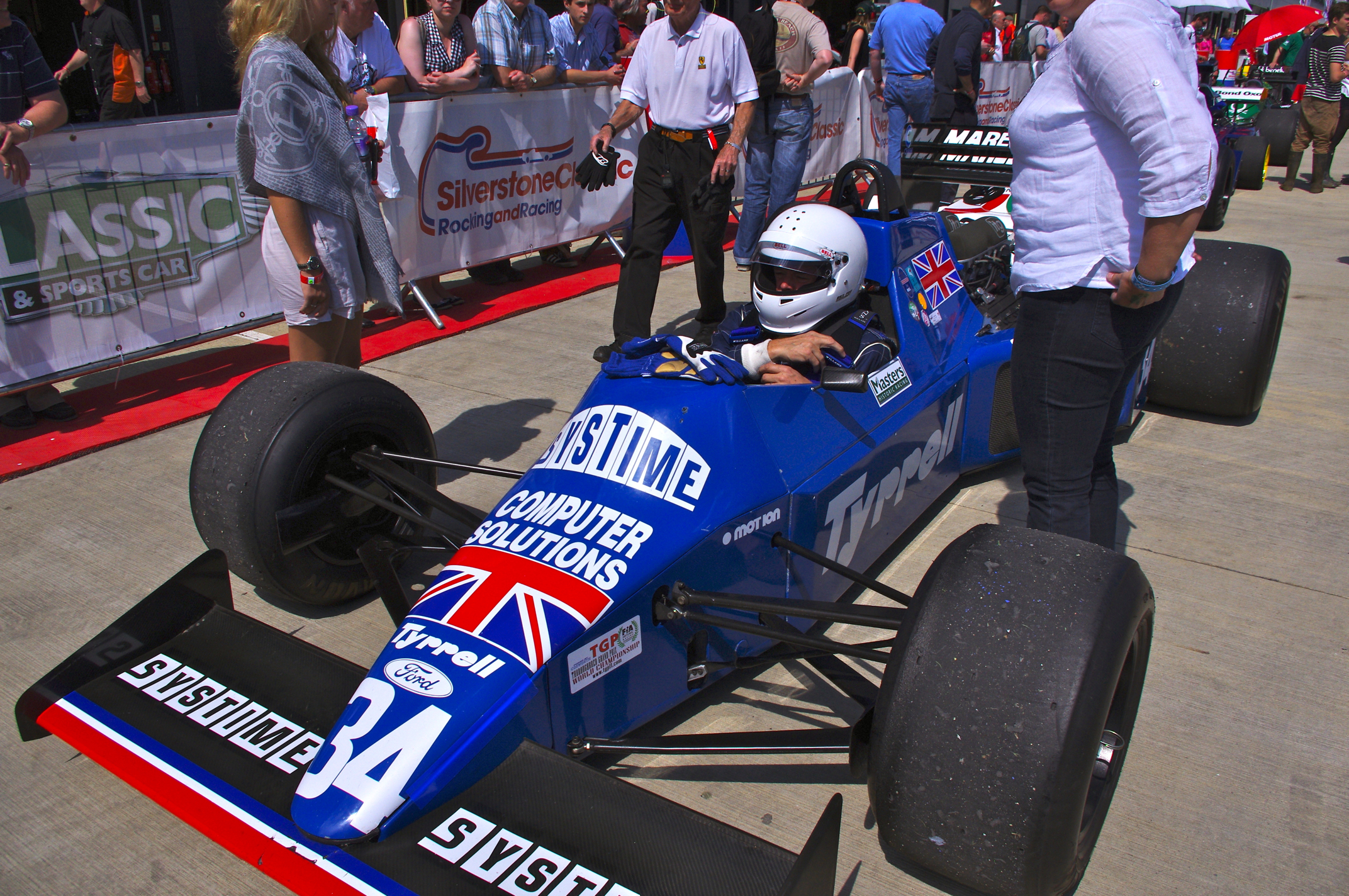
Systime sponsored a Tyrrell 012 racing car during the 1984 Formula One World Championship season (here seen at a 2012 Silverstone Classic event)

At its peak, Systime had some 1,370 employees and turnover of £60 million. Systime was growing at a 30 per cent annual rate during the early-mid 1980s and the strain on its finances was considerable.

Systime attempted to gain a greater public visibility during this period. They became shirt sponsor for Leeds United F.C. for the 1983–84 season, only the second such sponsor in the club's history, and they sponsored a Tyrrell 012 car during the 1984 Formula One World Championship season, with drivers such as Stefan Bellof, Mike Thackwell, and Stefan Johansson.

Relations between Gow and Control Data management did not work out, with the two parties clashing on fundamental decisions. Accordingly, Gow departed Systime in December 1983. He was replaced as managing director by Rod Attwooll, formerly head of the UK division of Texas Instruments. Gow subsequently started his own firm, WGK Electronics, hoping to succeed in largely untapped third-world markets.

== Legal actions filed by DEC ==
In putting together such PDP-11- and VAX-based systems, Systime was inevitably a rival of DEC UK, Digital's United Kingdom subsidiary, which sought to sell those systems themselves. Indeed, Systime had discovered in 1979 that it could acquire the same components for 25 per cent less in the United States than it could through DEC UK, and it filed anti-trust action in the United States to force DEC to sell it components at American prices.

In 1983, DEC UK sued Systime, claiming that Systime was engaging in practices that violated the license for the VAX/VMS operating system. The lawsuit was settled later in 1983 via Systime making a $5.5 million payment to DEC.

Then in June 1984, DEC sued Systime in the High Court of Justice, saying it had found evidence that Systime, in its layouts and connection schematics for the manufacture of seven different printed-circuit boards for VAX-associated disk drives and controllers, had infringed upon DEC copyrights. The claimed violations had taken place prior to 1983. The suit asked for £5 million in damages and came after a year of negotiations between the two companies had been unable to arrive at an out-of-court agreement. In July 1985, Systime counterfiled in the European Common Market, claiming that DEC's filing represented an attempted act of unfair competition in trying to limit Systime's ability to compete with DEC in the Western European market. The counterfiling also alleged that DEC had in fact infringed upon Systime's copyrights in the printed circuit board matter.

== Charges of violating export control restrictions ==
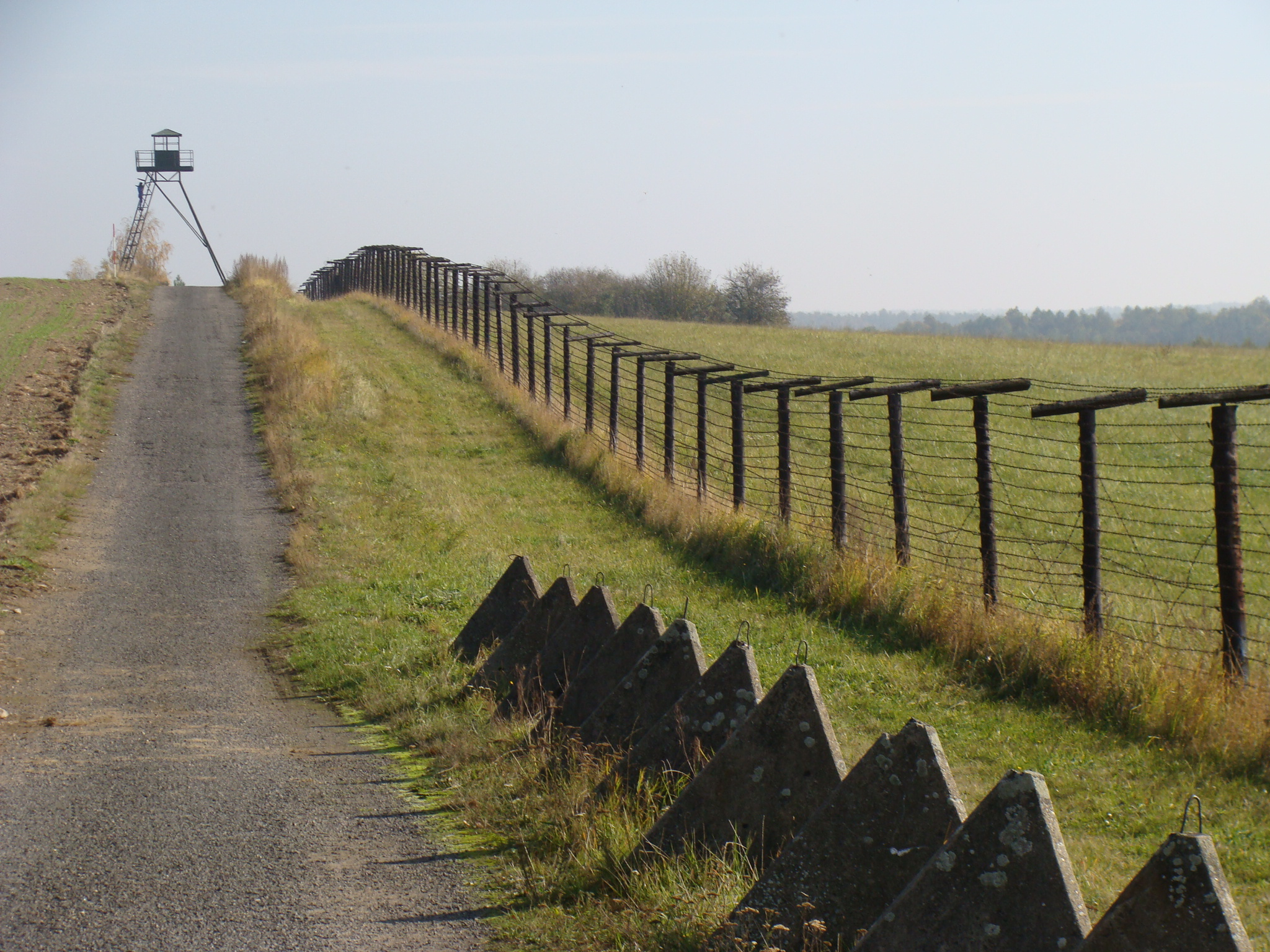
Eastern Bloc countries looked for a way to get Western computers across the Iron Curtain

In the early-mid-1980s Systime Computers ran afoul of the Coordinating Committee for Multilateral Export Controls (COCOM), which regulated what goods and technologies Western countries could sell to countries within the Eastern Bloc. British and other European companies protested that many of the computer components prohibited by COCOM were widely available in Asian markets anyway, but the regulations remained in effect. So in order to sell computers outside Britain, Systime not only had to obtain an export license from the Department of Trade and Industry (United Kingdom), but because American products were involved due to the DEC components in Systime computers, it had to obtain an export license from the United States Department of Commerce.

In 1982, Systime voluntarily acknowledged that it had sold some systems to Eastern Bloc countries without that necessary US export license and agreed to pay a fine to the Department of Commerce. However, lawyers for DEC UK pressed further with more serious charges, saying that Systime had not disclosed that it had shipped 400 DEC-based minicomputers, disguised as jukeboxes, to Switzerland that were in fact then headed for the Eastern Bloc.

Thus, Systime came under investigation by the United States Department of Commerce for irregularities in the export of computers from the United Kingdom during the 1980–83 period. In particular, while Systime was not accused of directly trading with the Soviet Union, it was said to have traded with non-aligned countries, including Switzerland, Libya, Syria, Zimbabwe, Pakistan, India, and Malaysia, without having the requisite US export license.

Systime denied that its actions were in violation of any British law. Some British officials felt that the export regulations were partly an effort to prevent British firms from gaining a foothold in the burgeoning computer market. In particular, Member of Parliament Michael Meadowcroft, representing the Leeds West constituency, tried to get the British government to intercede against the American action. The directors of Systime said that the export accusation was an underhanded way of those envious of the company's successes to target it. Indeed, they alleged, and MP Meadowcroft related in an address to the House of Commons, that DEC had created a "Kill Systime" campaign. Elements of this campaign, by this telling, included hiring of private detectives, surveillance of employees, burglary, bribery, destruction of documents, and spreading of false rumours. In any case, some of these allegations had been made at the time of the January 1983 meeting between Systime and Ferranti and STC, and these claims played a role in preventing a British-based financial rescue of Systime at the time.

The US action against Systime would involve a $400,000 fine against it, to be accompanied by a prohibition against the company using American goods. This had a devastating effect upon Systime, in particular as corporate investors were no longer willing to put monies into the company. Some 1,000 jobs were lost at the Leeds factory, leaving around only 200 employees remaining. Systime directors would put the overall cost to capital and profits at £110 million. As author George E. Shambaugh relates, "By 1985, in the aftermath of U.S. sanctions, the company was virtually destroyed."

A search by Systime for additional sources of UK funding having failed, in April 1985, Control Data Corporation acquired the balance of Systime that it did not already own. The purchase was also seen as a defensive measure against the still-ongoing U.S. Commerce Department investigation.

Then in February 1986, DEC bought 50 per cent of the Systime subsidiary from Control Data (which itself was experiencing financial struggles), taking over the Customer Services Division and all the services contracts for DEC hardware. That division had 250 employees and sales and field service contracts representing some 2,500 user accounts. As part of the deal, DEC dropped its £5 million copyright infringement lawsuit against Systime regarding the printed-circuit memory boards.

The DEC deal took away Systime's most lucrative business. MP Meadowcroft protested the action, accusing DEC of having "improperly colonized" Systime. In addition, during 1986 the Systel transaction processing monitor product was split off into the new firm Performance Software Ltd, via a management buyout. As author Kevin Cahill wrote, Systime had become "dismembered".

By 21 April 1986, Systime's tale was the lead story on the front page of The Guardian newspaper. The directors of Systime filed an action with the European Commission saying that the US actions were a breach of European Union laws protecting free trade among member nations, but the damage was done. The British government did eventually file a protest against the United States based on the allegation that the latter had used the Central Intelligence Agency to illicitly gain information about British companies. However the British government did not intercede in any way that forestalled the damage done to Systime, and Meadowcroft's efforts had come to naught.

The US–UK trade issues were by no means limited to Systime; smaller firms that could not afford the bureaucratic approval process of an export license were affected, as were much larger enterprises such as IBM and Toshiba. An investigation in 1985 conducted by Datamation magazine showed that there was an extensive grey market for computers, especially DEC equipment such as the VAX-11, and that Systime was but one of several sources for such products. Despite COCOM-based efforts to curtail such trade with the Eastern Bloc, it only grew more vigorous. The whole matter generated considerable debate during the second Thatcher ministry and a February 1987 editorial from The Guardian, one that mentioned Systime, emphasised the broader importance of the issue and criticised the prime minister for failing to fully take a stand against the Americans on behalf of British technology interests. A September 1987 account in the New Scientist also mentioned Systime as the worst hit and criticised COCOM as being antiquated.

The exports control issue was not the only factor that led to the collapse of Systime. Primary among the other causes was the company engaging in an overly aggressive expansion without having sufficient funding in place for it. Nevertheless, the role of the exports issue was critical.

== Further decline and initiatives in software ==
During 1986, with business in rapid decline and the company having lost £3.4 million the previous year, Systime moved to a smaller facility in the Leeds Business Park off Bruntcliffe Lane in the Morley area of Leeds. The "glass palace", officially opened just two and half years prior, was put up for sale. (An April 1988 piece in The Times pointed to Systime as a cautionary tale in seeing trends of economic rebirth in the North.)

Now, what remained of Systime – "a mere shadow of its former self", as Computergram International described it – decided to focus on Unix-based initiatives among its hardware and software offerings. During 1987, Systime announced its Series 3 computers, based on the Intel 80386 and running flavours of Unix, as well as an OEM agreement with Computer Consoles Inc. to resell that company's Power632S line of Intel-based systems. These joined the Intel-based Series 2 systems that Systime also offered. In addition, Systime forged an OEM agreement with Altos Computer Systems for that company's 80386-based Series 2000 systems, to further complement the Intel product line at different price points and numbers of supported users. Finally, Systime also formed an agreement with Parallel Computers, Inc. to resell that US-based company's fault-tolerant systems.

In terms of software offerings, Systime tried to ease migration for DEC PDP-11 users by offering its own Trans-Basic translator, which converted the BASIC programming language from a dialect used on RSTS to one used on Unix. A similar tool allowed users of the COBOL programming language on ICL or Wang Laboratories systems to migrate to Unix-based compilation and deployment.

As 1987 became 1988, Systime announced a strategic direction that embraced innovation in software over in-house production of hardware systems. Primary among these was a new product line called Visionware, the first piece of which was PC-Connect, which was in part a terminal emulator for Microsoft Windows that was composed of implementation elements that ran on both Unix and Windows, and supported cut-and-paste between Windows, graphical Unix-based X Window, and Unix character mode applications. PC-Connect was a released product from Systime by 1987, and was further emphasised in 1988. It found early customer use among Systime partners Altos Computer and Computer Consoles, as well as at the UK government's Central Computer and Telecommunications Agency and Manpower Services Commission. Ongoing work on the X Window aspects of it was done in collaboration with Cambridge-based IXI Limited. Several other Windows–Unix connectivity products were also under development as part of the Visionware line.

== Dissolution of company and legacy ==
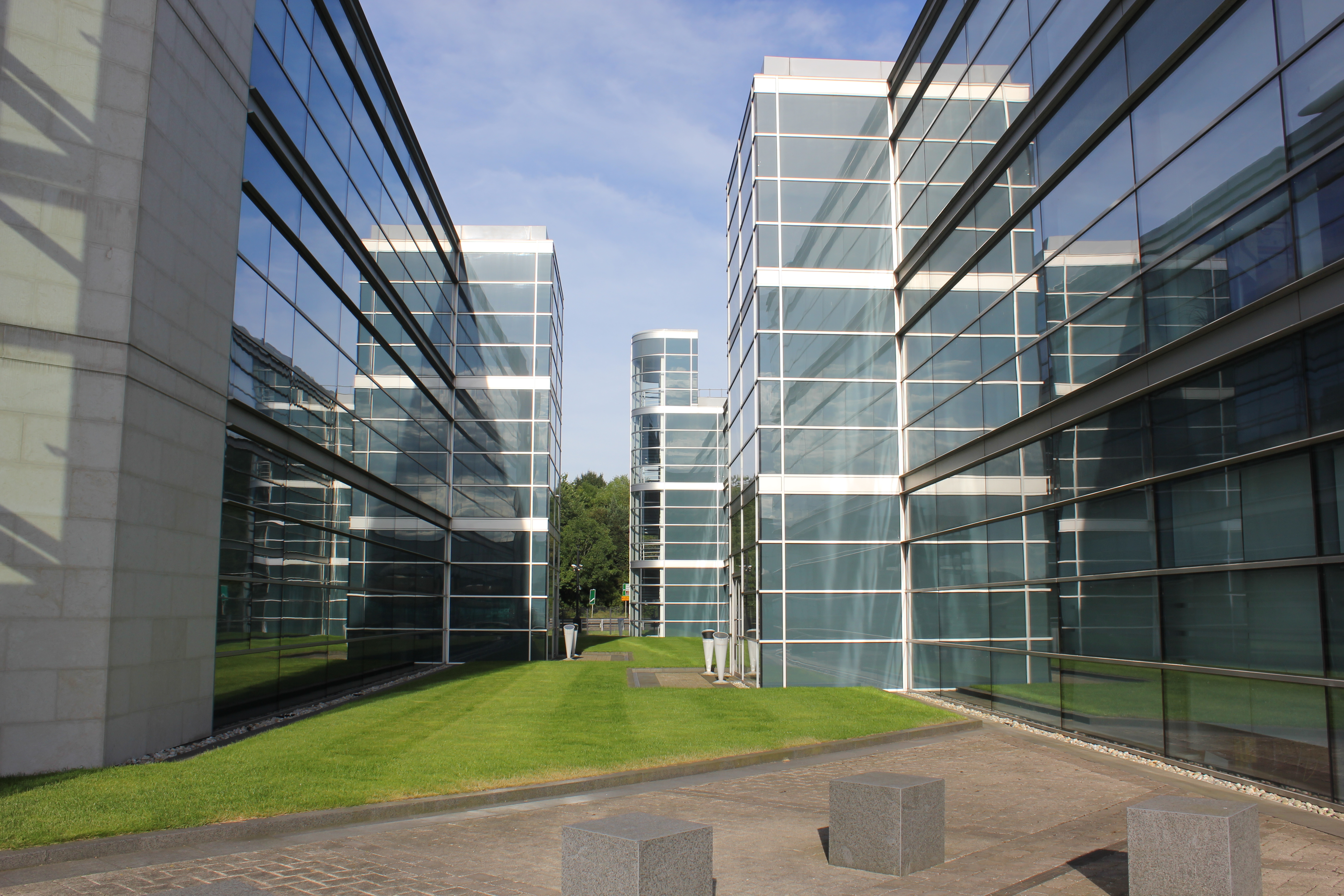
White Rose Office Park in Leeds (here seen in 2014) grew out of what once was the Systime Computers facility in the Beeston area of Leeds

On 2 June 1989, as Computergram International wrote, "Control Data Corp finally got shot of its troublesome UK Systime Ltd business ... and the solution for the once-substantial Leeds systems integrator is dismemberment by management buy-out." Four separate companies were formed from what had been Systime; the largest of these was Computer Service Technology Ltd, which gained the support and distribution rights for the rebadged Altos Computer Systems and Computer Consoles systems. The other three were Visionware Ltd, which gained the rights to PC-Connect and the Visionware technologies; Manufacturing Solutions Group Ltd, which gained the Sysimp Unix package for manufacturing control; and Streetwise Ltd, which gained Unix-based software for the back-office side for retail point-of-sale systems. Some venture capital monies were involved in support of the management buyouts. In addition, two financial packaged products were sold to other companies within Leeds.

Computer Service Technology carried on in Leeds into the mid-1990s, with activities such as becoming a UK distributor for Wyse Technology as well as, under the names CST Distribution and CST Group Ltd, continuing to sell what were now known as Acer Altos systems. After a 1996 merger CST became part of Sphinx CST, which in turn in 2010 became part of Arrow ECS.

Visionware succeeded to the point where it was acquired by the Santa Cruz Operation in 1994. It later become part of Tarantella, Inc., which was then acquired by Sun Microsystems and subsequently became part of the Oracle Secure Global Desktop. Noted British entrepreneur Peter Wilkinson, who later co-founded Planet Online and a number of other Internet-related firms, began his career at Systime. Many of his later efforts were based in Leeds and included former Systime employees.

Control Data kept the Systime UK name after the breakup, and that name was listed on subsequent company reports although essentially inactive. The last paper vestige of Systime Computers Ltd was not formally removed from the books at Companies House until 2015.

However, the Systime name was kept alive in a different venue. Systime had started a branch company in India in 1979 to do outsourcing work; this Indian entity was then acquired as a wholly owned subsidiary by the India-based CMS Group in 1984, during the time of turbulence for Systime UK. Doing business under the name Systime, and with essentially the same logo as Systime UK had had, this firm became substantial in size and a power in the global software projects field with offices around the world. It continued under the name and in the IT services business until it was acquired by KPIT Cummins in 2011; it kept the Systime name for a couple more years as a subsidiary; during 2014, the name effectively went out of use.

The Systime "Glass Palace" was bought and refurbished as the Arlington Business Centre, opened in 1988, and eventually became part of the White Rose Office Park. Leeds Industrial Museum (part of Leeds Museums & Galleries) holds examples of Systime computers in its collections, and an example was displayed in its exhibition Leeds to Innovation in 2019.
