= Silicon Graphics Image =

Raster graphics file format

- Filename extension: .sgi, .rgb (among others)
- Internet media type: image/sgi
- Type code: '.SGI'
- Uniform Type Identifier (UTI): com.sgi.sgi-image
- Magic number: 01 DA
- Developed by: Paul Haeberli
- Initial release: 0.95 / 1995; 31 years ago
- Latest release: 1.00; 1996; 30 years ago
- Type of format: image file
- Standard: SGI Image File Format

Silicon Graphics Image (SGI) or the RGB file format is the native raster graphics file format for Silicon Graphics workstations. The format was invented by Paul Haeberli. It can be run-length encoded (RLE). FFmpeg and ImageMagick, among others, support this format.

== Background ==
Common file extensions are:

.sgi or .rgb
3 color channels
.rgba
3 color channels and alpha
.bw or .int
black and white
.inta
black and white and alpha

This format was originally developed for IRIX. The master files of the SVT High Definition Multi Format Test Set are SGIs. Frame 200 of the ParkJoy sequence in this set (15722.sgi, 3840×2160, 47.4 MB) was used in WebP comparisons.

== Technical Details ==
SGI image format uses big endian order. The image data scans from left to right from bottom to top.

=== Header ===
Field number	Hex offset	Length	Field name	Description
1	0x00	2 byte	File signature/magic number	SGI Signature
2	0x02	1 byte	Compression	0 = Uncompressed, 1 = RLE compressed
3	0x03	1 byte	Bytes per channel	1 = 8 bit, 2 = 16 bit
4	0x04	2 bytes	Dimension	Image dimension, 3 for RGBA image
5	0x06	2 bytes	X size	Image width
6	0x08	2 bytes	Y size	Image height
7	0x0A	2 bytes	Number of channels	Number channels in the image file, 4 for RGBA image
8	0x0C	4 bytes	Minimum pixel value	Image's smallest pixel value
9	0x10	4 bytes	Maximum pixel value	Image's largest pixel value
10	0x14	4 bytes	Reserved	Unused, ignore
11	0x18	80 bytes	Image name	NOTE: C strings end with last byte 0x00
12	0x68	4 bytes	Color map ID	Only for color map image
13	0x6C	404 bytes	Dummy	Buffer to scale the header to 512 bytes. Ignore

File Signature/Magic Number

Should equal 0x01 0xda for SGI file.

Compression

0 if the file is uncompressed; 1 for RLE compression.

Bytes Per Pixel Channel

Value is 1 for 8 bits per channel ; 2 for 16 bits per channel.

Dimension

Value is 1 for 1 channel, 1 scanline image; 2 for 1 channel, multiple scanlines image; 3 for multiple channels, multiple scanlines image (most common).

X Size

Scanline width in pixels.

Y Size

Number of scanlines in the image.

Number of Channels

Number of channels in the image. Value is 1 for greyscale images; 3 for RGB; 4 for RGBA. SGI supports more than 4 channels.

Minimum Pixel Value

Smallest pixel value in all channels. Since SGI uses unsigned char or short types for channels, the smallest possible value is typically 0.

Maximum pixel value

Largest pixel value in all channels. Since SGI uses unsigned char or short types for channels, the largest possible value is typically 0xff for 8-bit/channel and 0xffff for 16-bit/channel.

Dummy

4 bytes unused.

Image name

Image name, 80-byte (maximum 79 characters ≠ 0x00) C string. If the name is shorter than 79 characters, all subsequent bytes are 0x00 to fill the 80-byte space.

Color Map ID

SGI supports 4 types of color mapping:

1. 0x00 normal: image has 1 channel (greyscale), 3 channels (RGB) or 4 channels (RGBA).
2. 0x01 dithered: image has packed RGB. First 3 bits are for R channel, next 3 bits are G channel, and last 2 bits are for B channel.
3. 0x02 screen: image uses colormap. Pixel data is index in color map and image only have 1 channel.
4. 0x03 colormap: file only have data for one color map (can use for different image file). This file no have image data.

Dummy

404 bytes. Typically unused. Scales the header to 512 bytes long.

=== Image Data ===
No Compression

Image data starts at byte 512 in file. Data length can be calculated using the following:

(X size) × (Y size) × (Num. of channels) × (Bytes per channel)

The data is separated for each channel. For example, if an image uses RGBA, the first set of scanlines represents the R channel, the next set of scanlines are for the G channel, then B channel and, lastly, A channel. Therefore, each set of scanlines can be accessed directly via the following formula (where C = channel index):

(X size) × (Y size) × (C ÷ Num. of channels) × (Bytes per channel)

RLE Compression

Offset tables start at byte 512. Their length can be calculated with the following:

(Y size) × (Num. of channels) × 4 bytes long

Each unsigned int in a table represents an offset (from file start) to the start of the compressed data of each scanline in each channel. The data is separated for each channel's scanline. If an image has RGBA channels, the order stays R, G, B, and A.

Next is the data length table which can also be calculated with the formula:

(Y size) × (Num. of channels) × 4 bytes long

This table holds the size of the compressed data (unsigned int) of each scanline. This size should equal the difference of numbers in the offset table.

The last data block holds RLE-compressed image data. If the number of bytes per channel is 1, the compressed data is of unsigned char type. Otherwise, if the number of bytes per channel is 2, the compressed data is of unsigned short type. The last byte of compressed scanline data has a value of 0.

In either case of unsigned char or unsigned short, the lowest 7 bits will tell the count. If bit 8 is zero, the count is the number times copy value after count. If bit 8 is one, the count is number times copy series of values after count byte. For 2 bytes/channel image, count and value are unsigned short, and top byte of count always equals zero.

== See also ==
- SGI IRIS
