= Tarantella, Inc. =

American software company

- Type: Private
- Industry: Computer software
- Founded: 1993 - existed as Santa Cruz Operation product line 2001 - independent
- Defunct: 2005, acquired by Sun Microsystems
- Fate: Acquired by Sun Microsystems in 2005
- Products: Terminal software, remote desktop software

Tarantella was a line of products developed by a branch of the company Santa Cruz Operation (SCO) since 1993. In 2001, SCO was renamed Tarantella, Inc. as it retained only the division that produced Tarantella. On July 13, 2005, Tarantella, Inc. was purchased by Sun Microsystems for US$25M. Tarantella exists now as a division of Oracle Corporation. (not visible as-of May 2026).

They produce and sell the Oracle Secure Global Desktop range of terminal services applications, formerly known as Sun Secure Global Desktop, Tarantella, and Canaveral iQ.

== History of the Tarantella product ==
In 1993, Santa Cruz Operation acquired IXI Limited, a software company in Cambridge, UK, best known for its X.desktop product. In 1994 it then bought Visionware, of Leeds, UK, developers of XVision. In 1995 the development teams from IXI and Visionware were combined to form IXI Visionware, later the Client Integration Division of SCO.

The Client Integration Division was relatively independent of the rest of SCO. Specialising in software to integrate Microsoft Windows and UNIX systems, it retained its own web site for some time and ported its software to all major UNIX platforms including those of SCO's competitors.

In 1997 the Client Integration Division released the Vision97 (later Vision2K) family of products: XVision Eclipse (a PC X server), VisionFS (an SMB server for UNIX), TermVision (a terminal emulator for Microsoft Windows), SuperVision (centralised management of users from Windows), SQL-Retriever (ODBC-compliant database connectivity software, later dropped) and TermLite (a lightweight version of TermVision). The VisionFS product was developed from scratch by the Cambridge development team; the other products were developed by the Leeds development team (mostly new versions of the existing Visionware products).

In parallel with Vision97 development, a separate development team began work in 1996 on a project codenamed Tarantella. The goal of this project was "any application, any client, anywhere": to provide access to applications of any type (hosted on back-end servers) from any client device that supported a Java-enabled web browser.

The first Tarantella web site, with live demos of simple applications, appeared in December 1996. The project codename stuck: it became the final product name. The first public release of Tarantella software was in November 1997. Later version 1.x releases supported more application types (such as Microsoft Windows applications) and client types (including native clients to remove the dependency on Java support), and added scalability and security features to better support larger enterprises and secure application access over the Internet.

The product was renamed Tarantella Enterprise II in late 1999, with a cut-down Tarantella Express product available on Linux systems. This renaming was a simple rebrand of the then-current 1.x release: no version 2.x software was released.

In April 2000 SCO reorganised into three divisions: the Server Software Division, the Professional Services Division and the Tarantella Division. At this time the web site moved from tarantella.sco.com to www.tarantella.com, reflecting the importance and independence of the Tarantella brand.

In November 2000 version 3.0 of the product was released, including a major rewrite of much server-side code in the Java language. The product was rebranded as Tarantella Enterprise 3, with releases for Linux and major UNIX systems. Further 3.x releases followed in subsequent years, adding more integration features in competition with similar software from Citrix.

== History of the Tarantella company ==
In 2001, having sold the UNIX business, the company renamed itself after its remaining product line. However, despite growth in sales, the company consistently failed to meet sales targets, citing the downturn in tech markets. Despite a well-regarded main product, the company was never profitable. The company laid off staff in 2001, 2002 and 2003.

In 2003 the company lost compliance with regulations for continued listing on NASDAQ's SmallCap market. As a consequence it implemented a 1-for-5 reverse stock split. At the same time it bought New Moon Systems, developers of Canaveral iQ, a terminal services application for Microsoft Windows that competed directly with Citrix.

The financial problems continued during 2003. In July, CEO Doug Michels stated that "isolated business practices" in the European Sales territory would affect revenues for the previous quarter. Later more discrepancies were found, causing a wider review of revenues for earlier quarters too. These reviews delayed the reporting of quarterly results, taking the company out of compliance with NASDAQ regulations once more.

In September 2003 the Chairman of the Board (and former SCO CEO) Alok Mohan became acting Chief Financial Officer, replacing Randall Bresee. In the following month the company was delisted from NASDAQ and began trading "over the counter". Also in October the company received additional private investment.

On December 11, 2003 Doug Michels was replaced as CEO by Frank Wilde. On January 6, 2004 John Greeley was appointed as the new CFO.

More changes at the top of the organization followed in February: most members of the executive team were replaced. At the same time US$16 million of additional investment was received, and in March the company acquired Caststream, Inc., a provider of collaboration software. (Caststream was run by several members of the management team that Frank Wilde brought with him.) In April the company began to comply once more with financial reporting obligations, and was seeking relisting.

On May 10, 2004 the company rebranded. The former Tarantella Enterprise 3 and Canaveral iQ products became Secure Global Desktop, Enterprise Edition and Secure Global Desktop, Terminal Services Edition respectively.

On May 10, 2005 Sun Microsystems announced that it would acquire Tarantella for $25 million cash, subject to regulatory and shareholder approval. Sun posted a letter to Tarantella customers indicating the company would be wholly assimilated after 90 days; on July 13, 2005, Sun announced that the acquisition was completed.

In July, 2005 Sun licensed the Microsoft Windows Terminal Server based Tarantella product SGD-TSE (formerly New Moon Canaveral IQ) to the UK-based company ProPalms. ProPalms rebranded SGD-TSE as ProPalms TSE and ProPalms has released version 5.0 of the product. The ProPalms product directly competes as a lower cost alternative to Citrix Metaframe. ProPalms assumed all of Tarantella's TSE customer obligations, and Tarantella's TSE development team joined ProPalms.

In July 2006, Tarantella moved from its location in Santa Cruz. (The building is now occupied by Georgiana Bruce Kirby Preparatory School.)

ProPalms acquired the shuttered Pano Logic in 2013.

In 2016, ProPalms changed its name to Thinspace.

== See also ==
- Web desktop
