= The Plan =

The Plan may refer to:

== Music ==
- The Plan (band), Swedish rock group
- Der Plan, a German electronic music group
- The Plan (Hillsong album), a 1998 Hillsong Music album
- The Plan (Tubeway Army album), an album of early demos and singles by Gary Numan's band Tubeway Army
- The Plan (Raze album), a 2000 album by Raze
- The Plan (The Osmonds album), a 1973 album by The Osmonds
- "The Plan" (Travis Scott song), 2020
- "The Plan", a song by Built to Spill from the 1999 album Keep It Like a Secret
- "The Plan", a song by G-Eazy from the 2017 album The Beautiful & Damned
- "The Plan", a song by NOFX, B-side to "Timmy the Turtle"
- "The Plan", a song by Prince from the 1996 album Emancipation
- "The Plan", a song by Richard Hell and the Voidoids from the 1977 album Blank Generation
- "The Plan", a song by Sunz of Man from the 1998 album The Last Shall Be First

== Television and film ==
- Battlestar Galactica: The Plan, a 2009 direct-to-DVD movie (later shown on television) based on the 2004 TV series
- The Plan (2014 film), a 2014 South Korean film
- The Plan (2015 film), a 2015 Indian film
- "The Plan" (The Amazing World of Gumball), a 2014 episode of The Amazing World of Gumball
- "The Plan" (Six Feet Under), a 2002 second season episode of the HBO series

== Other uses ==
- The Plan (video game), a 2007 PlayStation 2 game by Crave Entertainment
- The Plan (Washington, D.C.), a conspiracy theory regarding control of the city

== See also ==
- Plan (disambiguation)
- Planner (disambiguation)
