= Xsgi =

Graphics software

- Developer: Silicon Graphics
- Initial release: 1991; 35 years ago
- Operating system: IRIX
- Type: X Window System (X11) server
- Website: sgi.com

Xsgi is the X Window System (X11) server for the IRIX-based graphical workstations and servers from Silicon Graphics (SGI). Xsgi was released in 1991 with IRIX 4.0 on the SGI Indigo workstation.

== History ==
Work on Xsgi began in May 1989 when Tom Paquin left IBM to join SGI to integrate the X Window System with SGI's IRIS GL interface. Paquin recruited a set of software engineers experienced in X server implementation: Jeff Weinstein, Erik Fortune, Paul Shupak, John Giannandrea, Peter Daifuku, Michael Toy, Todd Newman, Spence Murray, and Dave Spalding.

Graphics hardware designed by Silicon Graphics provides accelerated rendering access through graphics hardware commands rather than memory-mapped framebuffers manipulated by the CPU. This makes the Monochrome FrameBuffer (MFB) and Color FrameBuffer (CFB) device-dependent rendering layers supplied with the MIT X11 Sampler Server inappropriate for Silicon Graphics hardware. Jeff Weinstein developed the No FrameBuffer (NFB) device-dependent rendering layer to support the Silicon Graphics style of hardware access. SCO later incorporated the NFB layer in its X server porting layer.

Silicon Graphics hardware includes overlay planes to provide a hardware overlay. Initial efforts by Todd Newman to implement overlay plane support in Xsgi eventually led to Peter Daifuku's "fully functional" support for overlay planes. Daifuku separated the notion of a window's visibility clipping region from the window's renderable clipping region. The previous MIT X sample server treats these two clipping regions as being the identical region. Xsgi advertises overlay planes as X11 visuals with their overlay characteristics described by the SERVER_OVERLAY_VISUALS convention.

Erik Fortune developed the X keyboard extension (XKB) for Xsgi.

Xsgi supports the X11, IRIS GL, OpenGL, Display PostScript, and PEX PHIGS rendering models.

== Publications ==
- Jeff Weinstein, "NFB, an X Server Porting Layer," Proceedings of the 6th Annual X Technical Conference appearing in The X Resource, Issue 1, January 1991.
- Mark J. Kilgard, "Going Beyond the MIT Sample Server: The Silicon Graphics X11 Server," The X Journal, SIGS Publications, January 1993.
- Mark Kilgard, Simon Hui, Allen Leinwand, Dave Spalding, "X Server Multi-rendering for OpenGL and PEX," Proceedings of the 8th Annual X Technical Conference appearing in The X Resource, January 1994.
- Todd Newman, "How Not to Implement Overlays in X," Proceedings of the 6th Annual X Technical Conference appearing in The X Resource, Issue 1, January 1991.
- Peter Daifuku, "A Fully Functional Implementation of Layered Windows," The X Resource, ISBN 1-56592-020-1, pgs. 239–249, 1993.
- Elias Israel, Erik Fortune, The X Window System Server, Digital Press, ISBN 1-55558-096-3, 1993.
