= Georgiana Bruce Kirby Preparatory School =

Location
- Santa Cruz, California; United States; 36.98744°N 122.03988°W

Information
- Type: Private
- Established: 1994
- CEEB code: 053290
- Head of School: Christy Hutton
- Grades: 6-12
- Enrollment: approximately 150
- Average class size: 12
- Colors: Blue and white
- Mascot: Griffin
- Website: Official website

Georgiana Bruce Kirby Preparatory School, commonly referred to as Kirby School, is a co-educational, non-sectarian, independent school located in Santa Cruz, California. The school educates students in grades 6–12.

== History and general information ==
Kirby School was founded in 1994. The school is named after Georgiana Bruce Kirby.

In August 2006, the school relocated to the Tarantella building in the Harvey West area of Santa Cruz.

=== Language ===
Kirby School offers American Sign Language (ASL), Latin, and Spanish.

== Extracurricular ==
Kirby School has 10 athletic teams, which include club teams and teams that compete in the Central Coast Section.

Kirby School has approximately 25 student-led clubs.

Each year, students in Kirby School music programs put on three concerts and additional open-mic events. They have a beginner strings group, chamber choir, chorus, jazz band, orchestra, and jazz choir.

In addition, students in Kirby School theater groups put on three theater productions every year: one play, one musical, and one middle-school musical.

== Affiliations ==
Kirby School is a member of, and is accredited by, the California Association of Independent Schools, the National Association of Independent Schools, and the Western Association of Schools and Colleges.
