= Georgiana Bruce Kirby =

English-born American teacher, activist (1818–1887)

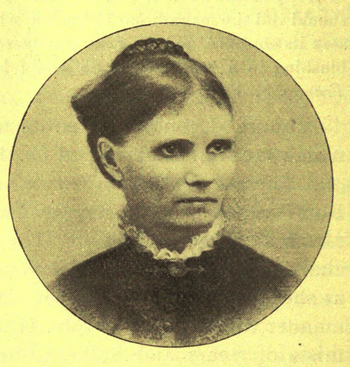
Georgiana Bruce Kirby, from an 1893 publication.

Georgiana Bruce Kirby (née Georgiana Bruce; 7 December 1818 – 27 January 1887) was an English-born American teacher and writer noted for her work in women's suffrage in the late 19th century. She founded the Santa Cruz Society of Suffragists in 1869.

== Early life ==
Georgiana Bruce was born on December 7, 1818, in Bristol, England. Lack of financial resources meant that she only had two years of formal schooling before taking positions with other families.

At fourteen, she became a governess to an English family, taking her to Paris and then Melbourne, Canada, where she became a school teacher and taught farming fundamentals. She returned to London in 1837 and within a year was working for the American Unitarian minister Ezra Stiles Gannett, who brought her to Boston at the age of twenty.

== Life in the United States ==
Georgiana joined the Transcendentalist community of Brook Farm at West Roxbury, Massachusetts, with her brother where they lived cooperatively. She studied at the school, ran the nursery, and participated in academic discussions with various Brook Farm literary members and visitors, including Ralph Waldo Emerson, William Henry Channing, and Margaret Fuller. These authors and the spirit of transcendentalism had a major influence on her and she began writing during this period.

By February 1844, Kirby had supported Brook Farm’s conversion to the French utopian social doctrines of Charles Fourier. She, however, thought the community had lost its spontaneity and she left to live in New York City. There, she networked with her friend Margaret Fuller, landing a job as assistant to Eliza Farnham, newly appointed matron of the Sing Sing Correctional Facility in New York. She worked at Sing Sing for a year, then left New York to teach at schools in Illinois and Missouri, before returning east to serve as a public school teacher and governess in Pennsylvania and New York.

With funds borrowed from Horace Greeley, Bruce travelled West in 1850 to join Farnham in Santa Cruz, California, where Farnham's late husband Thomas J. Farnham had been given a piece of land by Isaac Graham. Eliza Farnham had been ridiculed for her plan to bring a large group of single women to California, and eventually decided to travel there alone. Farnham and Bruce worked the farm for two years, producing poultry, potatoes, and fruit; at the same time, Bruce continued her involvement in furthering women’s rights, the Temperance movement, and the anti-slavery movement.

In 1852, Bruce married Richard Kirby, a local tanner, and subsequently had five children. She continued to write fiction and short stories. She kept a journal from 1852 to 1860.

== Women's rights ==
The abolitionist movement and the Civil War fuelled Bruce’s belief that women were enslaved. After the Civil War, she joined the women’s rights movement to secure the Fourteenth and Fifteenth Amendments. By 1869, she raised enough money to fund California’s first local woman's suffrage society. In 1870, she served as vice-president of the San Francisco Women’s Rights Convention. She reported on local lectures by Susan B. Anthony and Elizabeth Cady Stanton in the Santa Cruz Sentinel and criticized a California judge's decision that prevented women from voting and debated woman suffrage critics. In 1874, at the age of 56, she organized the Santa Cruz Temperance Union, which became affiliated with the WCTU, Women’s Christian Temperance Union, that successfully encouraged the prohibition movement later in the 1920s.

== Death ==
Georgiana Bruce Kirby died at the age of 68 on January 27, 1887. In the same year, her memoir up to 1850 was published, Years of Experience: An Autobiographical Narrative, alongside her diary.

Georgiana Bruce Kirby Preparatory School, in Santa Cruz, California, was named after her.

== Bibliography ==
- Transmission; or, Variation of Character Through the Mother, 1882
- Years of Experience, 1887
- Georgiana: Feminist Reformer of the West: The Journal of Georgiana Bruce Kirby, 1852-1860

== See also ==
- Fourierism
- Timeline of women's suffrage in California

== Sources ==
1. Guarneri, Carl. "Biographical Sketch of Georgiana Bruce Kirby". Alexander Street.
2. "Georgiana Bruce Kirby". New Brook Farm.
3. Kirby, Georgiana Bruce (1987). Steen, Judith B.; Swift, Carolyn (eds.). Georgiana Bruce Kirby: Feminist Reformer of the West. Santa Cruz County Historical Trust. ISBN 0-940283-02-6.
