= Extent File System =

- Developer(s): Silicon Graphics

Other
- Supported operating systems: IRIX

Extent File System (EFS) is an older extent-based file system used in IRIX releases prior to version 5.3. It has been superseded by XFS.
