= IXI Limited =

British company specialising in Unix software

- Type: Private
- Industry: Computer software
- Founded: 1987
- Fate: Acquired by SCO in February 1993
- Headquarters: Cambridge, United Kingdom
- Key people: Ray Anderson
- Products: Windowing software
- Revenue: $6 million (1992)
- Number of employees: 50 (1992)

IXI Limited was a British software company that developed and marketed windowing products for Unix, supporting all the popular Unix platforms of the time. Founded in 1987, it was based in Cambridge. The product it was most known for was X.desktop, a desktop environment graphical user interface built on the X Window System. IXI was acquired by the Santa Cruz Operation (SCO) in February 1993.

== Origins in the Cambridge hi-tech cluster ==
In the beginning of the 1970s, the so-called Cambridge hi-tech cluster became the site of a network of new firms in the rapidly growing computer field, many of which featured founders and employees who had studied at the University of Cambridge. And in particular, as an article in the journal Regional Studies has noted, IXI was one of many companies started by founders or employees or those in the nexus of Cambridge-based Acorn Computers, the most noted of which is ARM Holdings.

IXI founder Ray Anderson was a graduate of the university who had become director of research and development at Torch Computers, a computer systems firm located in the Cambridge area that was most known for making peripherals for the BBC Micro made by Acorn. Torch built workstations among its products, and also had a license agreement to provide NeXT with aspects of workstation technology.

In the end, Torch was not successful, but its work inspired Anderson to carry the idea on.

== Independent company ==
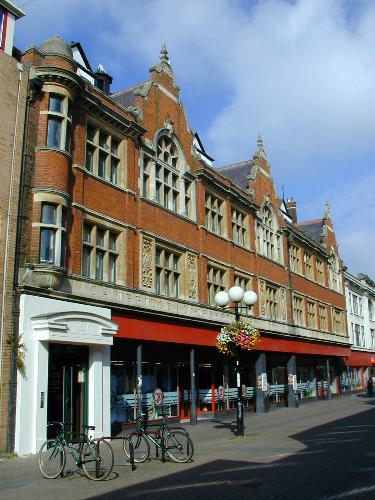
IXI's offices were in these buildings on Burleigh Street in Cambridge city centre, here seen in 2000

IXI Limited was founded by Ray Anderson in 1987 as a private company. Anderson originally had a former colleague as a partner, but the partner decided a start-up was too uncertain and pulled out within a year or so. Anderson found funding for IXI from sources in the United Kingdom, Germany, Austria, and Japan, but avoiding US investors as his prior experiences had made him leery of them.

As one former SCO UK employee has succinctly summarised, "IXI specialised in software that ran on Unix and made Unix easier to use." In particular, a goal was to make Unix workstations as easy to use as a Macintosh, which would allow non-technical people to use such platforms. IXI's best-known product was X.desktop, an X11-based graphical desktop environment with finder and file management capabilities for Unix systems. There was an opportunity for such a product because when the X11 version of the X Window System came out in 1987, it made a point of separation of mechanism and policy (indeed, it has been termed a canonical example of that design philosophy). Consequently, while it supported the ability to provide such things, it contained no specification for application user-interface design such as buttons, menus, or window title-bar styles, nor did it provide a standard window manager, file manager, or desktop.

The initial unreleased version of X.desktop, intended as a proof of concept, was programmed to the Xlib level; the first version that saw public release, 1.3, was based on the Xt library and Athena widgets. The X.desktop product then came to be based on Motif toolkit from the Open Software Foundation (OSF), a switch that happened in 1989 with release 2.0.

The first customers for IXI came in the financial industry, who were early adopters of Unix-based workstations. These were generally American companies, with sales to the Japanese market coming soon thereafter. Indeed, IXI has been characterized as an example of a "global start-up", in that instead of following the expected route for a start-up of establishing a domestic business first and then slowly expanding into international operations, it worked to establish an international business right away.

A crucial part of IXI's standard was to capitalize on standards and thus defeat competitors who were based more upon proprietary solutions. This later paid benefits when X.desktop proved cost-effective to internationalize to other languages.

X.desktop was sold as both shrink-wrapped software for end users, at a price of $495 for any platform, and on an OEM basis to system manufacturers. Early OEM customers included Locus Computing Corporation, BiiN, Olivetti, Acorn Computers and Compaq. An OEM sale was to IBM in 1989 for its RS/6000 and IBM AIX proved to be a turning point in IXI's fortunes. The SCO OpenDesktop product was another early adopter, and was another key usage of the product for the company. OEM customers gained by 1990 included NCR Corporation, Dell, Uniplex, Parallel Systems International, and Network Computing Devices.

As an InfoWorld article from 1990 stated, the ability to have OEM customers was a key factor in IXI Limited being successful. Part of this success was due to X.desktop coming with a customization toolkit that allowed system manufacturers to modify the appearance and functionality of the desktop environment to match their needs. The customization took the form not just of customizing icons, but the ability to tie icons to arbitrary series of commands.

The X.desktop product was stated as being ported to, and sold on, over a dozen different Unix variants. And as a paper published for a 1994 USENIX conference detailed, versions of X.desktop were actually built for over 30 different Unix platforms. The ability to maintain the portability of the X.desktop code base became a key factor in IXI's success with the product.

The primary competitor of X.desktop was the Looking Glass product from the American company Visix Software, Inc. Trade publications ran comparisons of the two desktop environments, and detailed cases where one beat another for an account.

Eventually over a million instances of X.desktop were in use. In 1992 IXI released Deskworks, a suite of productivity tools that included such things as a clock, a text editor, a mail client, a time management tool, and the like.

For 1992, IXI Ltd had revenues of about $6 million. By early 1993, the firm employed around 50 people, and in addition to its Cambridge headquarters, it also had offices in San Ramon, California, in the US and in Tokyo in Japan. According to a later article in MoneyWeek, by this time IXI had some 70% of the workstation market.

== Acquisition by SCO ==
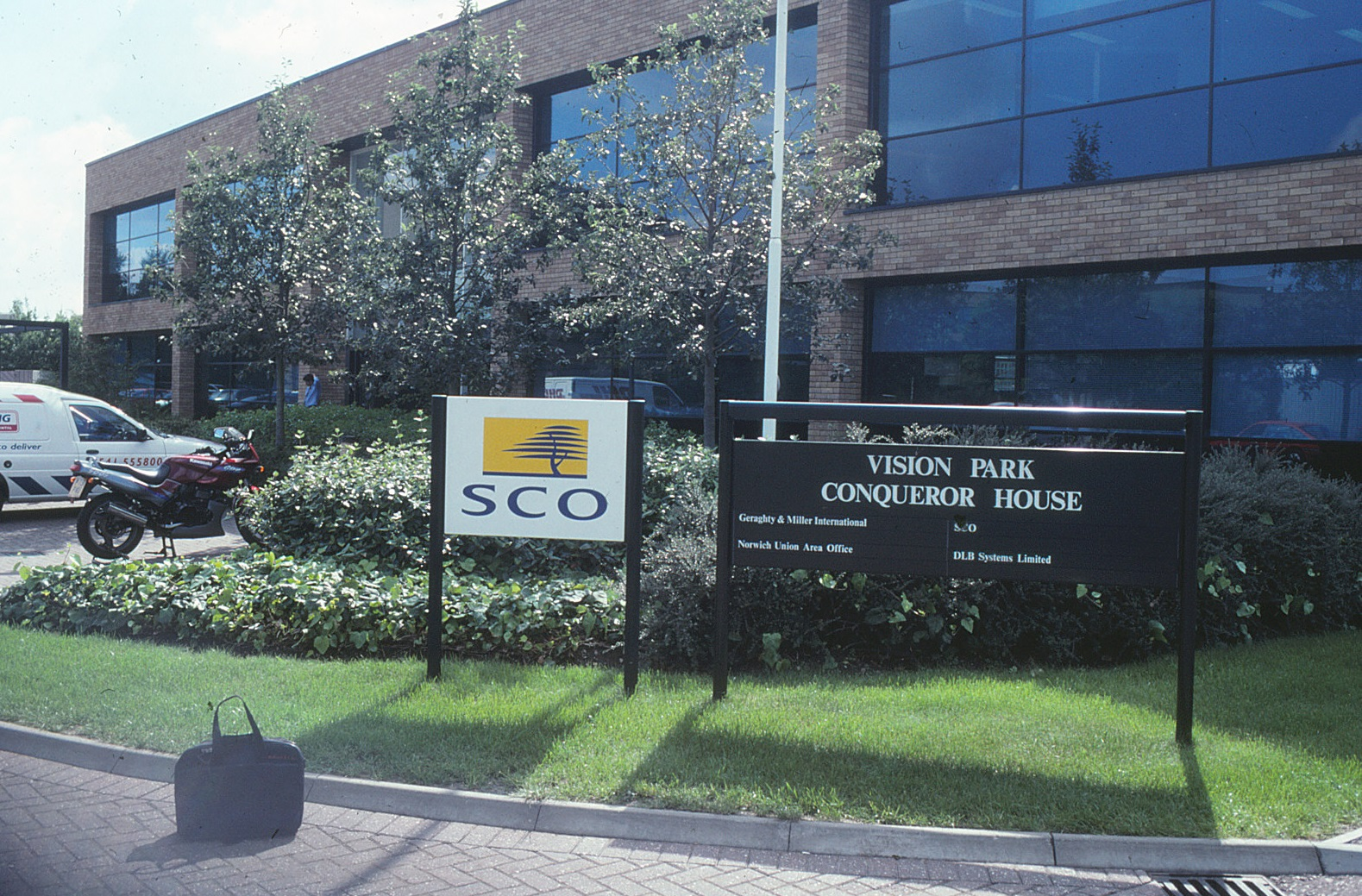
Around the time it was acquired by SCO, IXI moved its offices to Vision Park between Cambridge and Histon, here seen in 1997

IXI was acquired by the Santa Cruz Operation (SCO), in an announcement made on 25 February 1993. Terms of the purchase were not publicly disclosed, but did involve an exchange of stock. As mentioned, SCO had previously licensed IXI technology in its operating system product, and there were existing ties between the engineering and marketing functions of both companies. Anderson later said of his motivation to sell, that having gotten a 70% share, "getting the remaining 30% of the market would have required heavy reinvestment. I felt ready to move on."

The IXI brand continued on for the next couple of years as a relatively independent subsidiary of SCO. The announcement in mid-1993 by several major Unix vendors of the Common Desktop Environment (CDE) project posed a competitive threat to X.desktop, but it took two years of further development until CDE actually came out.

Several new products were introduced during this time. IXI Panorama, introduced about a month after the acquisition, was a Motif-based window manager, that could run with or without X.desktop; it had the ability to plot and manage a virtual space much greater than the physical space of the monitor itself. Panorama was extended in March 1994 with IXI Mosaic, reflecting the incorporation of the first popular web browser, Mosaic, into the SCO Global Access product, a modified version of SCO Open Desktop that served as an Internet gateway. In doing this, SCO and IXI put out the world's first commercial web browser based on Mosaic, and, according to Anderson, the first commercial web browser of any kind.

The IXI X.desktop with Panorama, running on top of SCO OpenServer

IXI Premier Motif was a product that came from IXI taking the OSF-released Motif source code and applying a set of bug fixes and enhancements and then porting it such that it would give identical behavior across platforms. IXI also offered some twenty different Motif training courses for users. The IXI Wintif product, which became available in 1994, built further upon Premier Motif to create a version of Motif that had the look-and-feel of Microsoft Windows 3.1 and thus would enable Windows users to operate Unix applications without confusion or need for additional training. A later version extended this capability to Windows 95.

Then in 1995, the IXI business unit of SCO was merged with another SCO acquisition, the Leeds-based Visionware, to form IXI Visionware. (IXI had previously collaborated with Visionware, going back to 1988 when the Visionware technologies were first being developed within Systime Computers Ltd.) Later in 1995 the merged business unit was subsumed more fully into its parent and became the Client Integration Division of SCO, which put out products from both former companies under the "Vision"-branded family name. This included the creation of VisionFS, an SMB server that could do network installs of the Windows components of the Vision family from a Unix server with minimal user configuration needed. This division then developed and released the Tarantella terminal services application in 1997 and that became the core of Tarantella, Inc. in 2001. Tarantella, Inc. struggled and following company-wide layoffs, the Cambridge development site closed in the summer of 2003.

== Fates ==
The X.desktop code gradually went into maintenance mode as X.desktop OEM providers migrated to CDE and many end-users abandoned Unix-based workstations altogether and switched to Wintel platforms. Ray Anderson left SCO after several years there, and in 1999 founded Bango plc, a mobile commerce company based in Cambridge.
