= Planner =

Planner may refer to:

- A personal organizer (book) for planning
- Microsoft Planner
- Planner programming language
- Urban planner
- Route planner
- Meeting and convention planner
- Japanese term for video game designer

== See also ==
- Plan (disambiguation)
- The Plan (disambiguation)
- Automated planning and scheduling
