= IRIX =

Computer operating system

- IRIX 6.5 desktop
- Developer: Silicon Graphics
- OS family: Unix (SVR3/SVR4.1ES)
- Working state: Historic as of December 2013
- Source model: Closed source
- Initial release: 1988; 38 years ago
- Final release: 6.5.30 / 16 August 2006; 20 years ago
- Marketing target: Workstations, servers
- Supported platforms: MIPS
- Kernel type: Monolithic kernel
- Userland: POSIX
- Default user interface: IRIX Interactive Desktop
- License: Proprietary

IRIX (/ˈaɪrɪks/, EYE-ricks, a portmanteau of IRIS and UNIX) is a discontinued operating system developed by Silicon Graphics (SGI) to run on the company's proprietary MIPS workstations and servers. It is based on UNIX System V with BSD extensions. The XFS file system and the now industry-standard OpenGL graphics API were originally developed by SGI for IRIX.

== History ==
SGI began using the IRIX name in the 1988 release 3.0 of the operating system for the SGI IRIS 4D series of workstations and servers. Previous releases are identified only by the release number prefixed by "4D1-", such as "4D1-2.2". The "4D1-" prefix continued to be used in official documentation to prefix IRIX release numbers. Prior to the IRIS 4D, SGI bundled the GL2 operating system, based on UniSoft UniPlus System V Unix, and using the proprietary MEX (Multiple EXposure) windowing system.

IRIX 3.x was based on UNIX System V Release 3 with 4.3BSD enhancements, and incorporated the 4Sight windowing system, based on NeWS and IRIS GL. SGI's Extent File System (EFS) replaced the System V filesystem.

IRIX 4.0, released in 1991, replaced 4Sight with the X Window System (X11R4), the 4Dwm window manager provided a similar look and feel to 4Sight.

IRIX 5.0, released in 1993, incorporates certain features of UNIX System V Release 4, including ELF executables. IRIX 5.3 introduced the XFS journaling file system.

In 1994, IRIX 6.0 added support for the 64-bit MIPS R8000 processor, but is otherwise similar to IRIX 5.2. Later 6.x releases support other members of the MIPS processor family in 64-bit mode. IRIX 6.3 was released for the SGI O2 workstation only. IRIX 6.4 improved multiprocessor scalability for the Octane, Origin 2000, and Onyx2 systems. The Origin 2000 and Onyx2 IRIX 6.4 was marketed as "Cellular IRIX", although it only incorporates some features from the original Cellular IRIX distributed operating system project.

The last major version of IRIX is 6.5, released in May 1998. New minor versions of IRIX 6.5 were released every quarter until 2005, and then four minor releases. Through version 6.5.22, there are two branches of each release: a maintenance release (identified by an "m" suffix) that includes only fixes to the original IRIX 6.5 code, and a feature release (with an "f" suffix) that includes improvements and enhancements. An overlay upgrade from 6.5.x to the 6.5.22 maintenance release was available as a free download, whereas versions 6.5.23 and higher required an active Silicon Graphics support contract.

A 2001 Computerworld review found IRIX in a "critical" state. SGI had been moving its efforts to Linux and the Windows-based SGI Visual Workstation but MIPS and IRIX customers convinced SGI to continue to support its platform through 2006. On September 6, 2006, an SGI press release announced the end of the MIPS and IRIX product lines. Production ended on December 29, 2006, with final deliveries in March 2007, except by special arrangement. Support for these products ended in December 2013 and they will receive no further updates.

Much of IRIX's core technology has been open sourced and ported by SGI to Linux, including XFS.

In 2009, SGI filed for bankruptcy and then was purchased by Rackable Systems, which was later purchased by Hewlett Packard Enterprise in 2016. All SGI hardware produced after 2007 is based on either IA-64 or x86-64 architecture, so it is incapable of running IRIX and is instead intended for Red Hat Enterprise Linux or SUSE Linux Enterprise Server. HPE has not stated any plans for IRIX development or source code release.

== Features ==
IRIX 6.5 is compliant with UNIX System V Release 4, UNIX 95, and POSIX (including 1e/2c draft 15 ACLs and Capabilities).

In the early 1990s, IRIX was a leader in Symmetric Multi-Processing (SMP), scalable from 1 to more than 1,024 processors with a single system image. IRIX has strong support for real-time disk and graphics I/O. IRIX was widely used for the 1990s and 2000s in the computer animation and scientific visualization industries, due to its large application base and high performance. It still is relevant in a few legacy applications.

IRIX is one of the first Unix versions to feature a graphical user interface for the main desktop environment. IRIX Interactive Desktop uses the 4Dwm X window manager with a custom look designed using the Motif widget toolkit. IRIX is the originator of the industry standard OpenGL for graphics chips and image processing libraries.

IRIX uses the MIPSPro compiler for both its front end and back end. The compiler, also known in earlier versions as IDO (IRIS Development Option), was released in many versions, many of which are coupled to the OS version. The last version was 7.4.4m, designed for 6.5.19 or later. The compiler is designed to support parallel POSIX programming in C/C++, Fortran 77/90. The Workshop GUI IDE is used for development. Other tools include Speedshop for performance tuning, and Performance Co-Pilot.

== 4Dwm ==
4Dwm is the window manager component of the IRIX Interactive Desktop normally used on Silicon Graphics workstations running IRIX. 4Dwm is derived from the older Motif Window Manager and uses the Motif widget toolkit on top of the X Window System found on most Unix systems. 4Dwm on IRIX was one of the first default graphical user interface desktops to be standard on a Unix computer system. 4Dwm refers to "Fourth dimension window manager" and has no relation to dwm.

Other X window managers that mimic the 4Dwm look and feel exist, such as 4Dwm theme for IceWM and MaxxDesktop which is a clone/compatible implementation of 4Dwm based on OpenMotif. MaxxDesktop supports both the classic SGI look and a modern/polished look and feel with anti-aliased fonts and UTF-8 support.

=== Features ===
- A stacking window manager
- Uses the Motif widget library via C++ Viewkit.
- Applications can be launched via a menu panel
- Window decorations include borders and a titlebar
- The titlebar provides a meta button and facilities to minimize and maximize windows
- Support for themes

== IRIS WorkSpace ==
IRIS WorkSpace, released in 1988, was a graphically organized iconic desktop environment that allowed access to the IRIX file system, along with simplified system administration via the system manager. The IRIS WorkSpace was used by Silicon Graphics from 4D1-3.0 - IRIX 5.0. It was succeeded in 1993 by the Indigo Magic Desktop introduced with IRIX 5.1 and the Indy workstation.

== See also ==
- IRIX software
- Silicon Graphics Image format about .iris
