= Airedale International Air Conditioning =

British HVAC systems company

- Founded: 1974
- Founder: Alan Duttine, Peter Midgley
- Headquarters: Leeds, West Yorkshire, England
- Website: airedale.com

Airedale International Air Conditioning based in Leeds, West Yorkshire, England is a British manufacturer and worldwide distributor of cooling, heating and HVAC systems.

Alongside its Leeds headquarters, Airedale has manufacturing facilities in South Africa and the United States, exporting to 60 countries worldwide. Airedale is part of the Modine group of companies, based in Wisconsin, United States, which employs approximately 6,400 people at 30 facilities in 16 countries.

== History ==
Airedale International Air Conditioning was founded in June 1974 by Leeds-based entrepreneurs Alan Duttine and Peter Midgley. The same year, Airedale Air Conditioning manufactures its first precision air conditioning unit and condenser unit, the VA5 and CU5.

In 1976, Airedale exported to its first overseas client in the Netherlands. Airedale moved to Park Mills, Rawdon, West Yorkshire in 1979.

In May 1982, Airedale Air Conditioning changed its name to Airedale International Air Conditioning Ltd. to reflect its growing export business. AIAC South Africa was formed in Johannesburg to manufacture precision air conditioning systems. In 1984, the company was the first UK manufacturer to develop a water cooling industrial chiller the ACC.

In 1994, the company was the first manufacturer to use R407C refrigerant in both chillers and precision air conditioning units.

Airedale was the first precision air conditioning manufacturer in Europe to introduce electronic expansion valves to their product in 2003. Two years later, in 2005, Airedale bought by US firm Modine for a reported $38 million. That same year, Alan Duttine retired after 39 years and was recognised with an OBE for his services to the industry. He passed away in 2015.

In 2009, Airedale launched its first IT cooling system the OnRak™. A year later, the company was first to develop a concurrent free cooling chiller with centrifugal compressor, the TurboChill FreeCool.

Airedale was the first to apply microchannel heat exchangers, concurrent free cooling and centrifugal compressors in the same chiller system - the DeltaChill in 2011.

In 2013, Airedale was the first UK manufacturer to develop a chiller incorporating the low global-warming potential (GWP) refrigerant R1234ze to hold British Standards Institution approval - the TurboChill. In the same year, Airedale opened an operations hub in Moscow, Russia.

In 2014, Airedale acquired Barkell Ltd., a UK leader in Air Handling Units. and opened an operations hub in Dubai, United Arab Emirates.

During a visit on May 10, 2016, Her Royal Highness The Princess Royal officially opened Airedale International’s new headquarters and manufacturing facility in Rawdon, Leeds.

=== Acquisition by Modine Manufacturing Company ===
Airedale was privately owned until 2005, when it was acquired by US-based Modine Manufacturing Company. Modine's products are used in light, medium and heavy-duty vehicles, heating, ventilation and air conditioning equipment (HVAC), off-highway, industrial equipment and refrigeration systems.

=== Acquisition of Barkell Ltd. ===
On 28 February 2014, Airedale International's parent company, Modine Manufacturing Company, announced it had completed the acquisition of Consett-based manufacturer of custom-built air handling units, Barkell Ltd. The acquisition allowed Airedale to extend its product portfolio to include a range of air handling Units (AHUs) which offer data centres, offices and industrial facilities and a cooling system which uses indirect fresh air as the primary cooling medium.

== Manufacturing locations & offices ==
Alongside its UK operations in Leeds, West Yorkshire, Airedale has manufacturing facilities in South Africa and the United States. Airedale is the only manufacturer of precision air conditioning systems in Africa. In November 2013, Airedale opened an operations hub in Moscow and in the Dubai Airport Freezone in February 2014.

== Products ==
Airedale has a number of products in over five air conditioning product ranges. These ranges include Precision Air Conditioning, IT cooling, Chillers, Comfort cooling, Condensers & Condensing Units, and Air Handling Units.

Airedale also provides building management systems and controls design and integration, service, maintenance, spare parts and offers air conditioning and refrigeration courses through its on-site training school.
