= Plan (calendar program) =

Calendar program with customizable warnings and multiuser mode

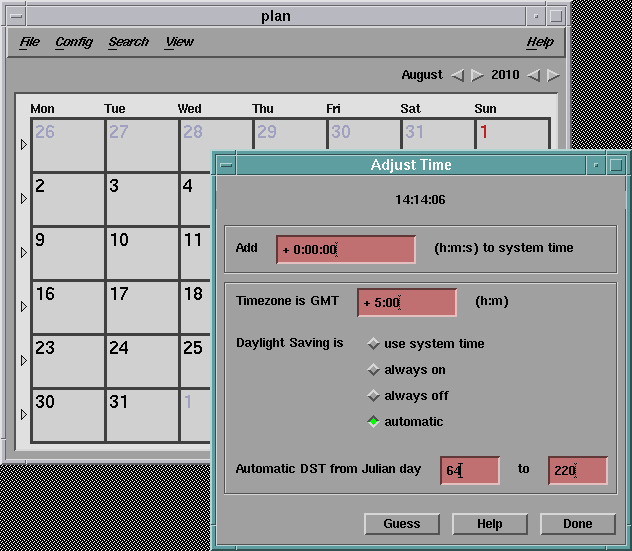
Screenshot of plan running

plan is a calendar and day planner program for the X Window System based on the Motif widget set. plan is free software released under a custom permissive license.

Its main window shows a month (the current one by default); the user can insert appointments at given days and time. An accompanying program pland reminds the user of appointments by showing a warning window or running an arbitrary shell script. Other features of plan are:

- configurability of warnings
- week/month/year views
- periodic appointments
- appointment types
- client/server multiuser mode

== See also ==
- List of personal information managers
