= X.desktop =

Early user interface built on the X Window System

X.desktop version 3.5, as seen in a 1992 screen capture

X.desktop was an early desktop environment graphical user interface built on the X Window System. It was developed and sold during the late 1980s and early 1990s by IXI Limited, a British software house based in Cambridge. Versions of X.desktop were available for over 30 different UNIX operating system platforms and it was licensed to various vendors, including IBM, Compaq, Locus Computing Corporation, BiiN and Acorn Computers, the latter licensing it in 1988 for its future workstation products.

The "very first version" of X.desktop used Xlib, whereas version 1.3 (being the "first version seen by end users") used the Athena widget set. From version 2.0 ("the third major version") and onwards, the product was based on the Motif toolkit. This contrasted with one rival, Visix Software's Looking Glass, which continued to use its own proprietary graphical user interface toolkit instead of adopting Motif.

X.desktop provided a user interface reminiscent of the Macintosh Finder, with the screen representing a desktop and with windows showing the contents of folders (or directories) in the filesystem. Such windows contained icons, each of which represented a file, folder or other filesystem object. Icons could be dragged outside windows (and thus onto the desktop itself) for convenient access in current and future login sessions. Double-clicking on icons initiated an open action on objects, with application programs typically being launched, although the nature of the action could be configured and multiple actions defined, such as the primary action for a text file being to open it in an editor, with a secondary action being to print the file. Icons could also be dropped onto other icons to initiate actions. For example, dropping a file icon onto a printer icon would initiate printing of the file. X.desktop was described as working "the way you'd expect a Unix/X application to work", seeking to represent the contents of the filesystem accurately.

Regarded as being aimed at users wanting "an easy-to-use, Macintosh-style graphical representation of a desktop", the product was highly configurable, although configuration activities were mostly aimed at experienced users or administrators who would set up environments for end-users or customers, and a dedicated configuration guide was provided to support such activities. The software required a minimum of 2 MB to 4 MB of RAM to function. It could be purchased for $495 for a single-user licence, with bulk prices available, but was also bundled with workstations from numerous vendors.

The IXI X.desktop with Panorama, running on top of SCO OpenServer

Later versions of X.desktop were often used in conjunction with IXI Panorama; a virtual desktop manager which had the ability to plot and manage a virtual space much greater than the physical space of the monitor itself.
