= Buckley London =

- Trade name: Buckley Jewellery Ltd
- Industry: Jewellery
- Founded: 1989
- Founder: Adrian Buckley
- Website: www.buckleylondon.com

Buckley Jewellery Ltd was founded in 1989 by Adrian Buckley, a UK-based manufacturer of high street costume and fashion jewellery, headquartered in Leeds, West Yorkshire. The Buckley London brand is stocked at over 1,000 international retail locations including 100 airports around the globe, plus 150 airlines and many cruise services.

== Awards ==
In July 2018, Buckley London was nominated for 'Fashion Jewellery Brand of the Year' at the Professional Jeweller Awards. In 2016 and 2017 Buckley London was consecutively nominated for 'Etailer of the Year' at the Retail Jeweller UK Jewellery Awards. The TFWA 2015 Frontier Awards saw Buckley London nominated for both 'Supplier of the Year' and 'Star Product' and at the DFNI 2016 Awards, Buckley London's Shard Collection was named 'Best New Jewellery Product'. Buckley London has previously been awarded the ‘Best Inflight Product’ title for its Russian Trio Set at both the 2011 and 2012 Airline Retail Awards, held as part of the Airline Retail Conference (ARC) in London.

== Brands and charity designs ==
As well as the global Buckley London brand, Buckley Jewellery Ltd also owns and designs for the BOUTON brand, plus the Attwood & Sawyer brand which was founded in 1956 and revived by Buckley London in 2010. Since 2010 Buckley London has worked closely with the Royal British Legion and their Poppy Appeal by supplying the charity with new crystal poppy brooch designs annually as part of The Poppy Collection; raising over £5 million in aid of the Poppy Appeal since the start of their relationship. Buckley London have also designed and manufactured charity pieces such as the official Breast Cancer Research Crystal Ribbon Brooch, and an official Help For Heroes Cancer Crystal Ribbon Brooch.

In 2012 Buckley Jewellery founded the ABC Trust, a charity which using money from donations and charity events has overseen the construction, funding and opening of both a school and orphanage in Kyasira, Uganda. Work on a new kitchen and dining room began at the orphanage in 2018 with additional funds provided by the ABC Trust.
