= MEX (windowing system) =

Unix windowing system

Mex
- Developer: Silicon Graphics
- Release: 1985; 41 years ago
- Operating system: IRIX
- Type: Windowing system

mex (multiple exposure) is a windowing system created by Silicon Graphics, used on 68k-based IRIS systems and early IRIS 4D systems. Mex was originally loaded over a network through the use of GL1 routines kept on a remote host machine, usually a VAX. When the IRIS 1400 workstation and GL2-W (IRIX) were introduced, mex was allowed to run locally. Mex was used in IRIX from the GL2-W2.1.0 release to the 4D1-2.3 release.

With the introduction of 4D1-3.0 (IRIX 3.0), and the complete migration to MIPS processors, support for the GL / GL2 powered mex ended in the late 1980s, replaced by Sun Microsystems' NeWS and the 4Sight window manager running with IRIS WorkSpace.
