= Looking Glass (desktop environment) =

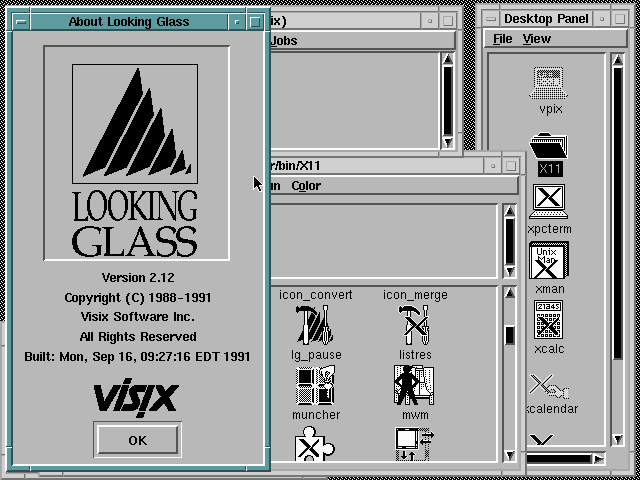

Looking Glass is a desktop environment for computers running the UNIX operating system. Developed by Visix Software, it was sold commercially until Visix went out of business.

Looking Glass was used as the desktop software bundled with INTERACTIVE UNIX System and Caldera OpenLinux.
