= Motif (software) =

GUI specification and toolkit for the X Window System

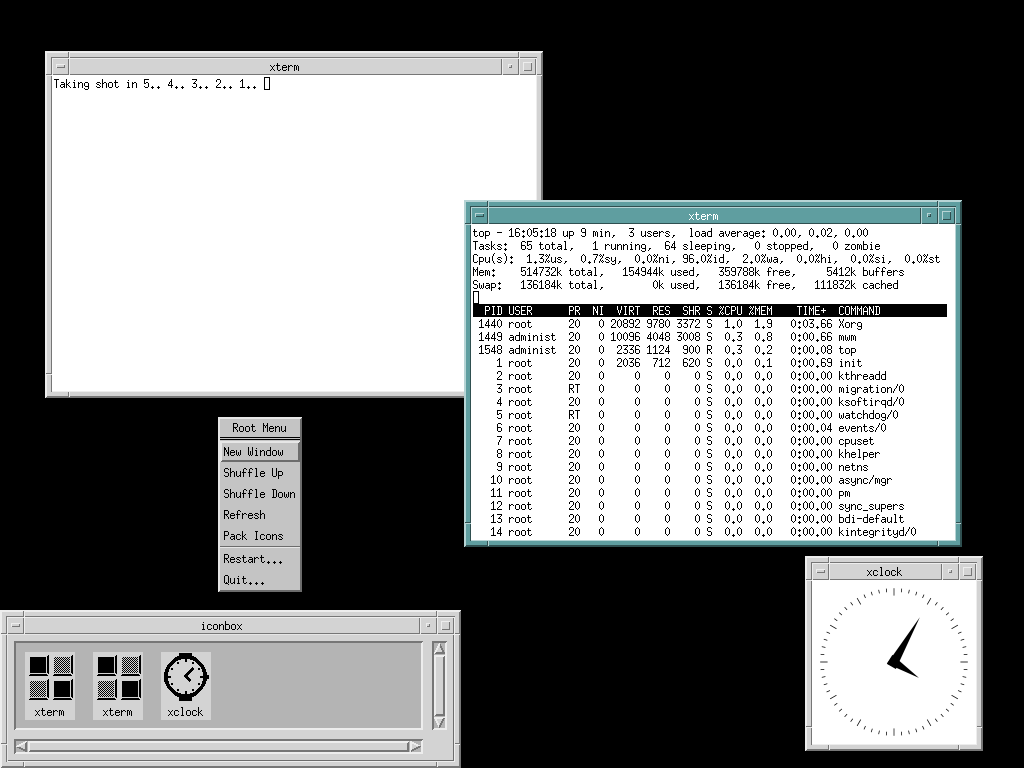
- Motif and the Motif Window Manager on Debian GNU/Linux
- Stable release: 2.3.8 / December 5, 2017; 8 years ago
- Written in: C
- Type: Widget toolkit
- License: LGPL-2.1-or-later (2.3.4 on); Proprietary (before 2.3.4)
- Website: motif.ics.com/motif/
- Repository: sf.net/p/motif/code/

Motif is a graphical user interface (GUI) widget toolkit for Unix-like operating systems using X11. Motif's look and feel is distinguished by its use of rudimentary square and chiseled three-dimensional effects for its various user interface elements.

Closely related to Motif is the Motif Window Manager (MWM).

Motif is the toolkit for the Common Desktop Environment (CDE) and thus became the standard widget toolkit for the commercial UNIXes that adopted CDE. CDE was part of the UNIX 98 Workstation Product Standard, so Motif was part of that standard. It was also the toolkit for the IRIX Interactive Desktop.

After many years as proprietary software, Motif was released in 2012, as free software under the GNU Lesser General Public License (LGPL-2.1-or-later).

== History ==
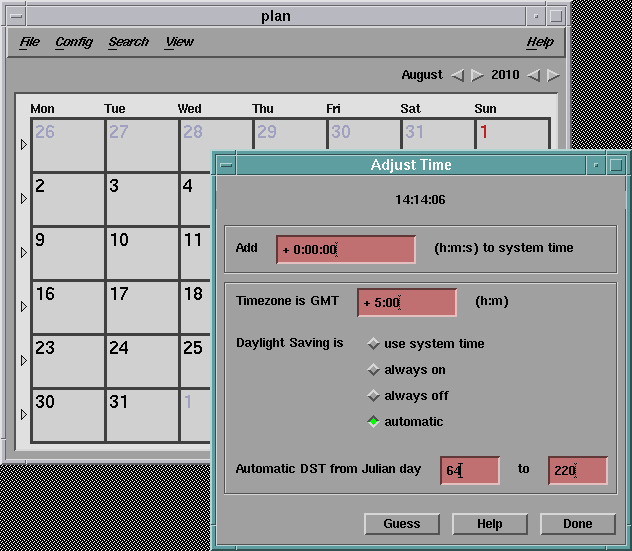
Screenshot of plan, an application that uses the Motif toolkit. The "chiseled" look of Motif is clearly visible.

Motif was created by the Open Software Foundation (OSF) to be a standard graphical user interface for Unix platforms. Rather than create a new interface from scratch, OSF opened a Request For Technology (RFT) in 1988 to solicit existing technologies from third parties. OSF intended to either adopt an existing interface wholesale, or create one using a combination of technologies from multiple existing products. Forty products were submitted, from which OSF selected twenty-three finalists. Among the finalists were Adobe Inc.'s Display PostScript, Sun Microsystems' OPEN LOOK, Digital Research's GEM, IXI Limited's X.desktop, Apollo Computer's Open Dialogue, Carnegie Mellon University's Andrew User Interface System, Digital Equipment Corporation's XUI, and Hewlett-Packard and Microsoft's CXI and PM/X. Ultimately, OSF selected a combination of the look and feel, window manager and Common User Access compliance from HP and Microsoft's CXI, along with the widget toolkit API and User Interface Language (UIL) from DEC's XUI. Motif was first shipped by OSF in 1989.

== Standardization ==
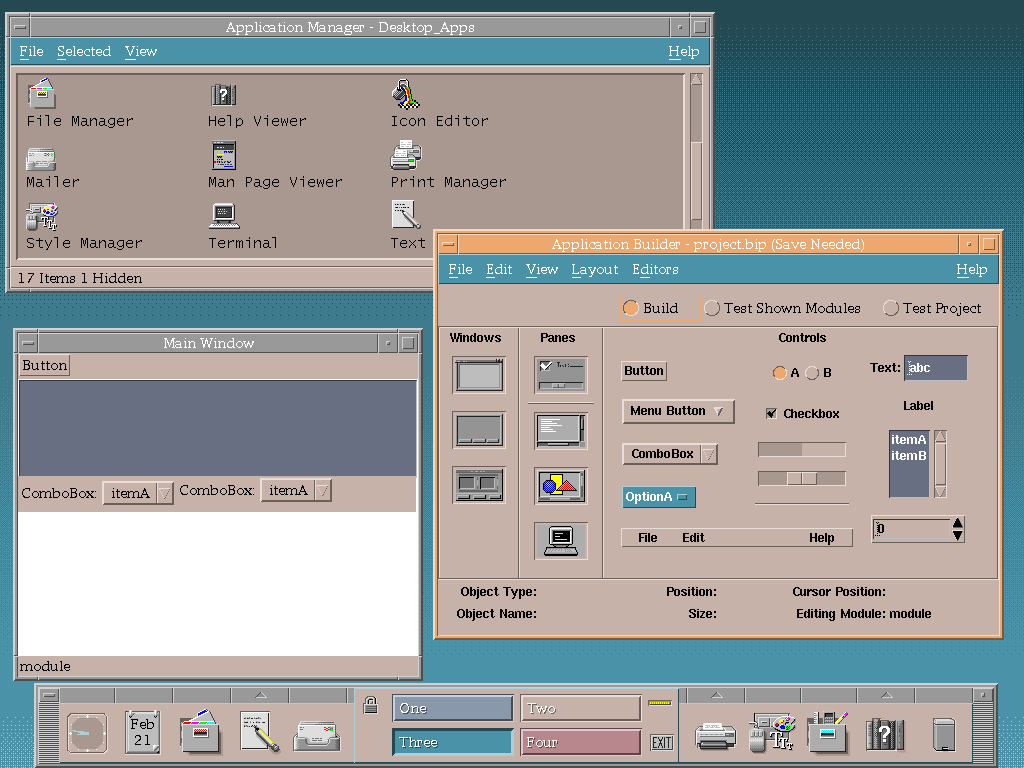
The Common Desktop Environment is built on top of Motif.

Motif is the basic building block of the Common Desktop Environment, which was the standard desktop for commercial Unix.

The IEEE 1295 standard (now withdrawn) defines the "Motif API". As of version 2.1, Motif supports Unicode, which made it widely used in several multilingual environments.

== Licensing ==
X Window System graphics stack: Motif is a library with graphical control elements.

=== Proprietary ===
Motif was originally made available under a license requiring royalty payments.

=== Open Motif ===
A version called Open Motif (substantially the same codebase under a different license) was released on May 15, 2000, under a license which allowed royalty-free distribution of Open Motif if the platform upon which it is used was open source – but was not an open source license itself. The name was criticized by Richard Stallman of the Free Software Foundation for likelihood to mislead people into thinking it was proper open source or free software, particularly for the Open Group's statement that they had "released the source code of Motif to the Open Source community". The initial release of Open Motif was version 2.1.30 in May 2000; Open Motif 2.3 was released in June 2007, followed by a 2.3.1 bug fix release in September 2008 and a 2.3.2 bug fix release in March 2009.

During the time when Motif was closed source software, the LessTif project was created with the aim of creating a free software implementation, under the LGPL.

=== GNU LGPL ===
In October 2012, Motif was released as a source code distribution under the GNU LGPL-2.1-or-later. Motif's source code is available on SourceForge.

== See also ==
- IBM Common User Access
- LessTif
- MoOLIT
