= Glide =

Glide may refer to:

- Gliding flight, heavier-than-air flight without the use of thrust
  - Gliding, a recreational activity and competitive air sport

== Science and technology ==
=== Computing ===
- Glide (API), a 3D graphics interface
- Glide OS, a web desktop
- Glide (software), an instant video messenger
- Glide (docking), a molecular modeling software

=== Other uses in science and technology ===
- Glide reflection, a geometrical transformation
- Bacterial gliding, a form of motility in biology

== Music ==
- Glide (album), by Jerry Douglas, 2008
- "Glide", a song by Phish from the 1992 album A Picture of Nectar
- "Glide", a song by Stone Temple Pilots from the 1999 album No. 4
- Glide (music synthesis), a musical synthesizer parameter equivalent to portamento
- Glissando, an unbroken slide from one musical pitch to another

== People ==
- Glide, a stage name of guitarist Will Sergeant (born 1958)
- The Glide, nickname of Clyde Drexler (born 1962), an American basketball player

== Other uses ==
- Glide (automobile), manufactured by the Bartholomew Company, 1902–1920
- Glide (linguistics), or semivowel
- Glide (Martian crater)
- Glide, Oregon, a place in the United States
  - Glide High School
- Glide, a Pillow Pal toy
- Glide FM, a former local radio station in Oxfordshire, UK
- Glide Memorial Church, San Francisco, California, United States
  - Glide Foundation
- Oral-B Glide, a dental floss
- USS Glide, the name of two ships of the US Navy

== See also ==
- Glider (disambiguation)
- Gliding (disambiguation)
