= Common glider =

Common glider may refer to:

- Tramea loewii, a dragonfly in the family Libellulidae found in Oceania
- Cymothoe caenis, a butterfly in the family Nymphalidae found in Africa
- Neptis sappho, a butterfly in the family Nymphalidae found in Europe and Asia

== See also ==
- Glider (disambiguation)
