= Online OS =

- Stable release: 1.3.01 (01.08.2008)
- Type: Web application
- License: EUPL (All Applications)
- Website: Online Operating System

iCUBE Network Solutions
- Type: Private
- Founded: 2005
- Headquarters: Vienna, Austria
- Website: icube.at

The Online Operating System was a fully multi-lingual and free to use web desktop written in JavaScript using Ajax. It was a Windows-based desktop environment with open-source applications and system utilities developed upon the reBOX web application framework by iCUBE Network Solutions, an Austrian company located in Vienna.

== About the project ==
OOS.cc, which is short for Online Operating System, was a web application platform that mimicked the look and feel of classic desktop operating systems such as Microsoft Windows, Mac OS X or KDE. It consisted of various open source applications built upon the so-called reBOX web application framework.

As applications could be executed in an integrated and parallel way, the OOS could have been considered a web desktop or webtop. It provided basic services such as a GUI, a virtual file system, access control management and possibilities to develop and deploy applications online. As the Online Operating System was executed within a web browser, it was no real operating system but rather a portal to various web applications, offering a high usability and flexibility.

The project was partly funded by grants from the Internetprivatstiftung Austria (IPA). As at 01.08.2008 almost 20.000 users have joined the oos.cc community, using the offered featured and applications.

== History ==
The development of the web desktop was started by iCUBE Network Solutions in 2005, followed by the first beta releases in 2006. Hence, together with YouOS and eyeOS, it can be considered to be one of the first publicly available systems of its kind. The first full version including core-level multi-language support, the file system and a basic set of applications was released to the public in March 2007 on the occasion of a national exhibition (ITnT Austria) and has left beta state half a year later in October 2007. The first release considered stable (1.0.0) was published in July 2007. The project itself and the contained applications have received several national innovation awards (see,) and have gained attention mainly due to the comprehensive approach taken (see,).

OOS.cc started as a national project. The full platform including all offered applications are currently available in three languages (German, English as well as Spanish) and is receiving increasing coverage around the world (for examples see, or).

The current version is 1.3.01 from 01.08.2008.

== Technical overview ==
The project is fully written in JavaScript, exclusively using DHTML techniques to run in any web browser without any additional software installation needed. The system implements a modern kind of web application model, excessively using Ajax for communicating between client components and the Java server backend in an exclusively asynchronous manner. Aim is to offer users the unique interaction behavior following the desktop metaphor, which is the main idea of any web desktop. Also typical for this sort of web application is the broadly use of Javascript-on-demand techniques, cutting the complete project source into pieces and loading them instantly when needed.

Based on this technical basis, reBOX was the framework library all applications in oos.cc were built on. It is a flexible and extensible API, including a GUI widget set, communication mechanisms and server services offering general and framework specific services.

The Online Operating System itself consisted of a basic framework, which was able to launch any JavaScript application using the reBOX library. The user interface was based on the behavior of the Windows desktop with a start menu, a task bar and a desktop background. All applications were running in this environment. At server side, there were Java based web services that ran to serve the client processes and to provide data from the relational database in the backend.

oos.cc also provided an integrated development environment called Developer Suite, which allowed the community to build own applications for the desktop environment based on reBOX (see development section below).

== License ==
All applications available in oos.cc were open source under the European Union Public Licence (EUPL).

The reBOX development toolkit is free to use developing any applications for the webtop.

== Features ==
As mentioned above, all applications published on oos.cc are open source based on the EUPL, and can be "installed" or "deinstalled" to what-ever preferences the user has.

Besides global services like the multi-language support or the global theme support, as well as some minor tools and games, oos.cc offered four major services that could be used completely free of charge.

- Integrated and fully flexible file storage (1 GB per user)
  - HTTP as well as FTP file transfer from and to local file system
  - User-based file-shares within the oos-community
  - WebDAV access
  - Document Management (including Version Control and File Locking mechanisms)
- Image publishing, organization and post-processing
- A free sub domain (user.oos.cc) for web- or image publishing, directly integrated in the desktop
- Groupware applications, including free mail, fetchmail and contact management
- An integrated development environment where oos-applications can be created directly from within the system (see development section below)

Next releases were planned to focus on an extensive security and privacy suite, dealing with challenges like anonymous communication (browsing as well as temporary mail-addresses) as well as offering encrypted password and file storage and connectivity services. Since its initial stable release, OOS.cc could have been accessed using https to ensure secure communication.

== Limitations and drawbacks ==
- Limited number of applications: no commercial applications can be hosted. Only reviewed applications are being published
- No processing of popular office formats (.doc, .odt, etc.)
- Limited language support: Only English, German and Spanish
- Dependence on foreign infrastructure: No possibility to extend storage, no additional/guaranteed bandwidth, etc.

== Development ==
One of the key focuses of the team was right from the beginning to offer a very flexible and comprehensive API, that can be used to develop not only custom applications within oos.cc, but also stand-alone web-applications or to integrate single components in existing web-sites. By decoupling the development from web-related "problems" using the reBOX API web-applications can be development in a similar fashion to any Java program: Elements can be positioned and can interact like in high-level object oriented programming languages, without taking care of divs, browser specific behavior or communication handling. The framework also offers multi-language and theme support for existing as well as newly created applications, allowing changing almost every aspect of the look and feel of the used components according to the preferences of its users.

For taking advantage of this approach, one of the applications offered in the OOS was an integrated Development Suite, allowing directly writing and executing code and hence creating new programs within the boundaries of the web computer. All applications on oos.cc were released as open source, thus all existing programs were offered to be imported, reviewed or changed and then locally deployed. Following this idea, every user was free to submit changed or newly created applications to be included in the globally offered application set. The last release offered features like auto-completion and an outline-window.

== See also ==
- Web portal
- Web desktop

=== Similar applications ===
- Jolicloud
- youOS
- eyeOS
- DesktopTwo
- SilveOS
- G.ho.st
- The Sky Pc
