= Windows 93 =

Online simulated operating system

- Programmers: jankenpopp, Zombectro
- Engine: HTML5
- Platform: Web Browser
- Release: November 1, 2014
- Genres: Fictional Web OS, parody
- Modes: Single-player, Multiplayer (Minigames)

Windows 93 (often stylised as WINDOWS93) is a website stylised to look and work as an operating system, often called a web desktop, and a parody of the Windows 9x series. It was developed and is managed by two French musicians and programmers who go by the handles jankenpopp and Zombectro. The site features several web applications which reference and feature Internet memes from the late 1990s and early 2000s.

== History ==
=== Version 0 ===
Version 0 is an initial proof-of-concept build that jankenpopp gave to Zombectro. It features an interactive start menu and draggable icons. The version only had 1 working app.

=== Version 1 ===
Version 1 is the first release version, finished on November 1, 2014. It added more functionality to windows and the start menu, and introduced several apps (for a total of 38), including a fully-functional web browser.

=== Version 2 ===
Version 2 is the previous version of Windows 93, published on June 10, 2017. Version 2 added the A: drive which allows users to store files, run custom JavaScript and apply custom CSS from the browser's local storage. It introduced several more apps, including Trollbox, a web chat application; and Bindowzuchan, an imageboard (the latter of which is discontinued).

=== Version 3 ===
Version 3 is the latest version of Windows 93 with a public beta released on February 14, 2023. It was released with a complete rework of the Sys42 framework. It removed almost all the apps from Version 2 and added some new ones. Trollbox was brought back in the winter of 2023.

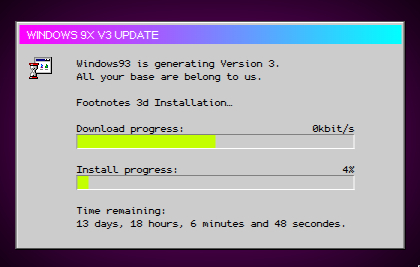
A screenshot of the countdown leading to version 3's release

A countdown for the release of version 3 was started on February 14th, 2026, and ended on February 28, 2026.

== Popularity ==
When Windows 93 was released in October of 2014, It amassed 4,000,000 users in two weeks.

== Applications ==
The website contains many applications:

=== Version 1 and 2 ===
- Terminal: Executes commands
- Cat Explorer: A semi-functional web browser
- Trollbox: A live chat.
- 93 Realms: A text-based RPG
- ANSI Love: An image browser
- ASCII Gallery: A gallery of ASCII Art
- MIDI Jukebox: A MIDI music player
- Potato.yt: A YouTube video
- Recorder: An audio recorder
- Piskel: A Pixel Art editor
- CodeMirror: An Integrated Development Environment
- HexEd: A Hex editor
- 3D: Creates 3D text saying "Windows93"
- Calc: A Calculator
- Bananamp: An audio player
- SAE: A Commodore Amiga emulator
- Maze 3D: A 3D maze rendered with characters
- Poney Jockey: Meme soundboard
- Byte Beat: Music composition application
- Speech: Voice synthesizer
- FX: Applies effects to the screen
- Robby: A thief simulator with text-based graphics
- Virtual PC: Launches another instance of Windows93 inside the current instance
- Hampster [Sic?]: Displays GIFs of hamsters with music

=== Version 3 ===
- Chess960: A chess implementation
- Diapason: Simulates various instruments
- I know basic: A BASIC interpreter, with support for three different versions.
- ImageViewer: An image viewer
- Karoké: A karaoke application
- MediaPlayer: A video and audio player
- TextEdit: A text editor that imitates Windows Notepad
- GAFA 3D: Full name Castle GAFA 3D; Parody game of Wolfenstein 3D
- KOF '93: Full name: King of Fighters; Parody game of Street Fighter

== Cultural references ==
Windows 93 includes the PlayStation bootup sound when entering the system, it also includes an ASCII rendition of Star Wars.

== See also ==
- Windows96.net
