= ThinDesk =

ThinDesk is a hosted desktop platform for small and mid-sized businesses.

== History ==
The ThinDesk platform allows an organization's users to access company-related data and applications via a web portal. This portal can be accessed using PCs, tablets, or dummy terminals that are connected to the Internet. This type of service is generally called cloud-based, and more specifically referred to as a Platform-as-a-Service (PaaS).

ThinDesk as a company was founded in 2006 and partnered with Telus in 2007 to provide the datacentres necessary to support the platform and its customers. In 2012, ThinDesk was bought by Insite Computer Group. There are currently two versions of ThinDesk, 1.0 of which is ThinDesk Legacy, which consists of the original platform design. The original platform was based on a version of private cloud computing. After the buyout by Insite Computer Group Inc, a 2.0 version was established on an improved underlying architecture to increase service reliability.

In February 2015 Insite Computer Group Inc. Merged with F12.net. ThinDesk was adopted as a cloud brand and will be developed into ThinDesk 3.0 in 2017 under the F12.net banner.
