= DesktopTwo =

Webtop software

Desktoptwo
- Developer: Sapotek
- Stable release: Beta
- Type: Web application
- License: AGPLv1 Creative Commons
- Website: desktoptwo.com

Desktoptwo was a free Webtop (whose URL was desktoptwo.com and which is now a parked domain) developed by Sapotek (whose URL was sapotek.com, which also is now a parked domain). It's also been called a WebOS although Sapotek stated on its website that the term is premature and presumptuous. It mimics the look, feel and functionality of the desktop environment of an operating system. The software only reached beta stage. It had a Spanish version called Computadora.de. Desktoptwo was web-based and required Adobe Flash Player to operate. The web applications' found on Desktoptwo were built on PHP in the back end. Features included drag-and-drop functionality. Sapotek had liberated all the web applications found on Desktoptwo through Sapodesk on an AGPL license.

Desktoptwo belonged to a category of services that intended to turn the Web into a full-fledged platform by using web services as a foundation along with presentation technologies that replicated the experience of desktop applications for users. In a "Cloud OS" the functionality of a server was granularized and abstracted as Web services that Web developers used to create composite applications similar to how desktop software developers use several APIs of the OS to create their applications. Sites like Facebook attempt to create a similar effect by exposing their APIs and allowing developers to create applications upon these.

Some of the features found on Desktoptwo were: File sharing, Webmail, Blog creator, Instant messenger, Address book, Calendar, RSS Reader and Office productivity applications.

Desktoptwo.com and the Sapotek website no longer operate.

== See also ==
- Web portal
- Web desktop
