= Multiple frames interface =

A multiple frames interface (MFI) is a type of user interface which displays information in a set of frames or panels that can be scrolled vertically on a screen. It is an integrated interface designed to bring together virtually all the services of an internet portal or an operating system onto a single screen.

== History ==
Paned windows were introduced in file browsers in the 1990s in order to divide the window into sections for a more intuitive approach. Netscape 2.0 introduced the elements used for html frames in the 1990s (see Netscape Navigator). At that time, Netscape proposed frames to the W3C for inclusion in the HTML 3.0 standard. IGoogle with its gadgets is an early type of MFI.

== Description ==
An MFI consists of a set of panels that can be maximized, minimized, restored, or moved, being tiled on a scrollable "page" on the screen. As of January 2009, only HTML-based MFIs are functional, and no "desktop" versions are available. The HTML-based MFI is an alternative to the web desktop, allowing simultaneous use of multiple rich web applications.

== Advantages ==
The MFIs have several advantages over desktop environments:

- From a visual standpoint, the work with frames is more fluent.
- Frames do not overlap on the screen.
- The number of frames on the screen is limited to a number that can be handled by the user.
- Several frames are permanently on screen.

== Shortcomings ==
- Scrolling the set of frames can be difficult.
- Many panels open permanently use more memory.
