= YouOS =

Computer software

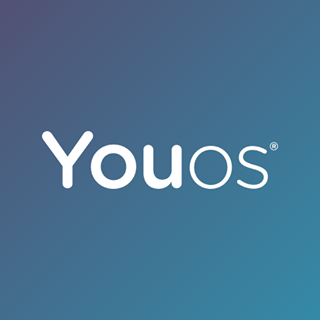
- Developer: dynacrowd
- Stable release: 0.025
- Platform: Android
- Type: Mobile App
- Website: http://www.youos.com

YouOS was a web desktop and web integrated development environment, developed by Webshaka until June 2008.

== History ==
From 2006 to 2008 YouOS replicated the desktop environment of a modern operating system on a webpage, using JavaScript to communicate with the remote server. This allowed users to save their current desktop state to return to later, much like the hibernation feature in many true operating systems, and for multiple users to collaborate using a single environment. YouOS featured built-in sharing of music, documents and other files. The software was in alpha stage, and was referred to as a "web operating system" by WebShaka.

An application programming interface and an IDE (integrated development environment) were in development. Over 700 applications were created using this API.

In 2006, YouOS was listed on the 7th position of PC World's list of "The 20 Most Innovative Products of the Year".

YouOS was shut down on July 30, 2008 because the developers had not actively developed it since November 2006. They have since moved on to other projects.

The domain youos.com domain name was acquired by a German startup company, Dynacrowd, in May 2015. The project name YouOS now represents a mobile platform for hyperlocal interaction used to operate the German refugee assistance system AngelaApp.

== Parent Company ==
Webshaka was a messaging company most notable for making YouOS. It was founded by Samuel Hsiung, Jeff Mullen, Srini Panguluri and Joseph Wong.
