= EyeOS =

Web-based operating system

eyeOS
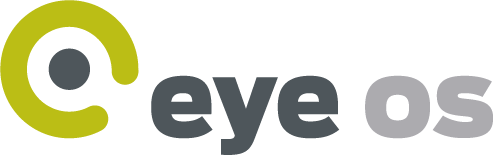

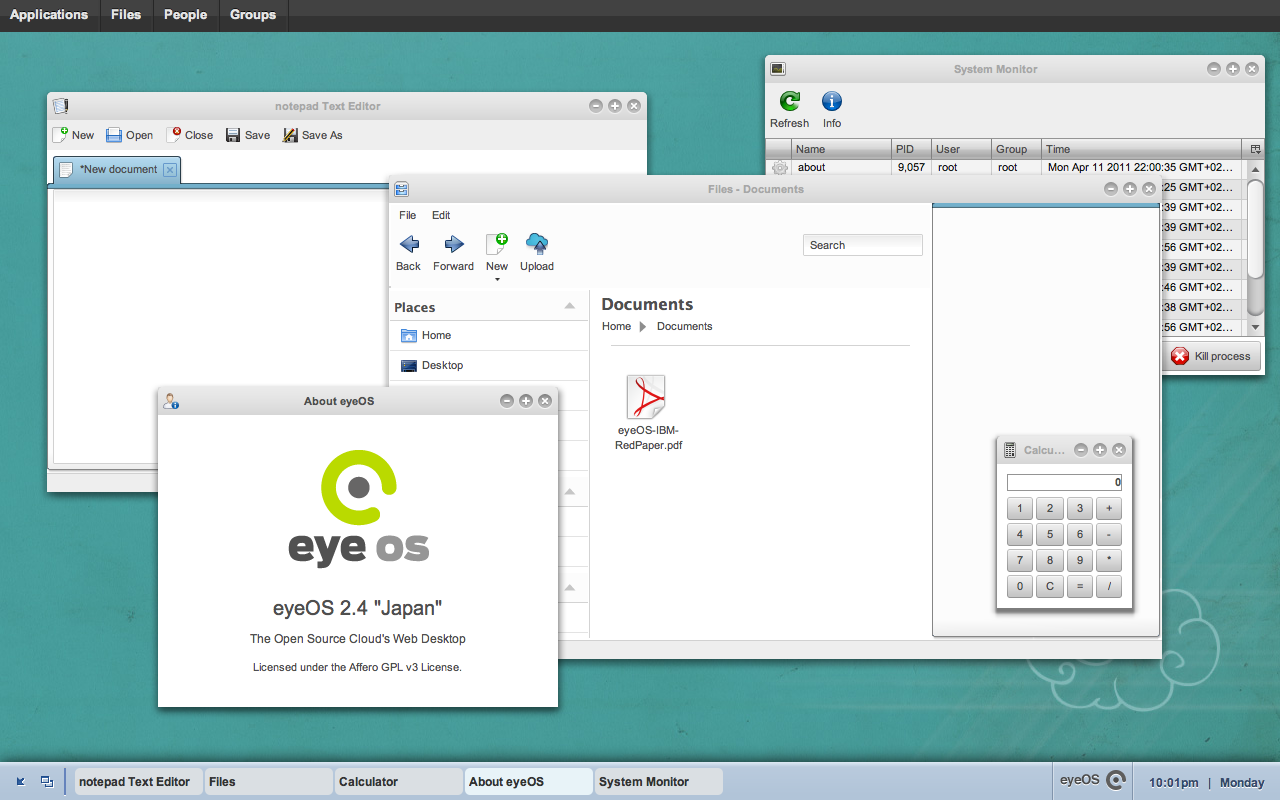
- eyeOS 2.4 screenshot
- Release: August 1, 2005
- Stable release: Professional Edition / April 3, 2012; 14 years ago
- Written in: PHP, XML, JavaScript
- Platform: Cross-platform
- Available in: Multilingual
- Type: Web application
- License: Before version 2.5: free software license; After version 2.5: proprietary license
- Website: eyeos.org at the Wayback Machine (archived 2010-03-31)

eyeOS was a web desktop for cloud computing, whose main purpose is to enable collaboration and communication among users. It is mainly written in PHP, XML, and JavaScript. It is a private-cloud application platform with a web-based desktop interface. eyeOS delivers a whole desktop from the cloud with file management, personal management information tools, and collaborative tools, with the integration of the client's applications.

== History ==
The first publicly available eyeOS version was released on August 1, 2005, as eyeOS 0.6.0 in Olesa de Montserrat, Barcelona (Spain). A worldwide community of developers soon took part in the project and helped improve it by translating, testing, and developing it.

After two years of development, the eyeOS Team published eyeOS 1.0 on June 4, 2007. Compared with previous versions, eyeOS 1.0 introduced a complete reorganization of the code and some new web technologies, like eyeSoft, a portage-based web software installation system. Moreover, eyeOS also included the eyeOS Toolkit, a set of libraries allowing easy and fast development of new web applications.

With the release of eyeOS 1.1 on July 2, 2007, eyeOS changed its license and migrated from GNU GPL Version 2 to Version 3.

Version 1.2 was released just a month after the 1.1 version and integrated full compatibility with Microsoft Word files.

- eyeOS 1.5 Gala was released on January 15, 2008. This version was the first to support both Microsoft Office and OpenOffice.org file formats for documents, presentations, and spreadsheets. With this version, eyeOS also gained the ability to import and export documents in both formats using server-side scripting.
- eyeOS 1.6 was released on April 25, 2008, and included many improvements such as synchronization with local computers, drag and drop, a mobile version, and more.
- eyeOS 1.8 Lars was released on January 7, 2009, and featured a completely rewritten file manager and a new sound API to develop media-rich applications. Later, on April 1, 2009, 1.8.5 was released with a new default theme and some rewritten apps, such as the Word Processor and the Address Book. On July 13, 2009, 1.8.6 was released with an interface for the iPhone and a new version of eyeMail with support for POP3 and IMAP.
- eyeOS 1.9 was released on December 29, 2009. It was followed up with the 1.9.0.1 release with minor fixes on February 18, 2010. These releases were the last of the "classic desktop" interfaces. A major re-work was completed in March 2010, now called eyeOS 2.x.

However, a small group of eyeOS developers still maintain the code within the eyeOS forum, where support is provided, but the eyeOS group itself has stopped active 1.x development. It is now available as the On-eye project on GitHub.

Active development was halted on 1.x as of February 3, 2010. eyeOS 2.0 release took place on March 3, 2010. This was a total restructure of the operating system. The 2.x stable is the new series of eyeOS, which is in active development and will replace 1.x as stable in a few months. It includes live collaboration and more social capabilities than eyeOS 1.x. eyeOS then released 2.2.0.0 on July 28, 2010.

On December 14, 2010, a working group inside the eyeOS open-source development community began the structure development and further upgrade of eyeOS 1.9.x. The group's main goal is to continue the work eyeOS has stopped on 1.9.x.

eyeOS released 2.5 on May 17, 2011. This was the last release under an open source license. It is available on SourceForge for download under another project called eyeOS 2.5 Open Source Version.

On April 1, 2014, Telefónica announced their acquisition of eyeOS. eyeOS would maintain its headquarters in the Catalonia, Spain, where their staff would continue to work but now as part of Telefónica. After its integration into Telefónica, eyeOS would continue to function as an independent subsidiary under CEO Michel Kisfaludi.

== Structure and API ==
For developers, EyeOS provides the eyeOS Toolkit, a set of libraries and functions to develop applications for eyeOS. Using the integrated Portage-based eyeSoft system, one can create their own repository for eyeOS and distribute applications through it.

Each core part of the desktop is its own application, using JavaScript to send server commands as the user interacts. As actions are performed using AJAX (such as launching an application), it sends event information to the server. The server then sends back tasks for the client to do in XML format, such as drawing a widget.

On the server, eyeOS uses XML files to store information. This makes it simple for a user to set up on the server, as it requires zero configuration other than the account information for the first user, making it simple to deploy. To avoid bottlenecks that flat files present, each user's information and settings are stored in different files, preventing resource starvation from occurring, though this in turn may create issues in high volume user environments due to host operating system open file descriptor limits.

== Professional edition ==
A Professional Edition of eyeOS was launched on September 15, 2011, as an operating system for businesses. It uses a new version number and was released under version 1.0 instead of continuing with the next version number in the open source project. The Professional Edition retains the web desktop interface used by the open source version while targeting enterprise users. A host of new features designed for enterprises, like file sharing and synchronization (called eyeSync), Active Directory/LDAP connectivity, system-wide administration controls, and a local file execution tool called eyeRun were introduced. A new suite of Web Apps (a mail client, calendar, instant messaging, and collaboration tools) was also introduced, specific to the enterprise edition for the web desktop. With eyeOS Professional Edition 1.1, a to-do task manager tool, Citrix XenApp integration, and a Facebook like 'wall' for collaboration were introduced.

== Awards ==
- 2007 – Received the Softpedia's Pick award.
- 2007 – Finalist at SourceForge's 2007 Community Choice Awards at the "Best Project" category. The winner for that category was 7-Zip.
- 2007 – Won the Yahoo! Spain Web Revelation award in the Technology category.
- 2008 – Finalist for the Webware 100 awards by CNET, under the "Browsing" category.
- 2008 – Finalist at the SourceForge's 2008 Community Choice Awards at the "Most Likely to Change the World" category. The winner for that category was Linux.
- 2009 – Selected Project of the Month (August 2009) by SourceForge.
- 2009 – BMW Innovation Award.
- 2010 – Winner of Accelera (Ernst & Young).
- 2010 – Asturias & Girona Spanish Prince award “IMPULSA”.
- 2011 – Winner of MIT's TR35 award as Innovator of the Year in Spain.

== Community ==
eyeOS community is formed with the eyeOS forums, which reached 10,000 members on April 4, 2008; the eyeOS wiki; and the eyeOS Application Communities, available at the eyeOS-Apps website, hosted and provided by openDesktop.org as well as Softpedia.

== See also ==
- Web portal
- Web 2.0
