= Gliding (disambiguation) =

Gliding is a recreational activity and competitive air sport in which pilots fly unpowered aircraft known as gliders or sailplanes.

Gliding may also refer to:

- Gliding flight, flight in the absence of thrust
- Gliding motility of microbes.
- Gliding (vehicle), a natural deceleration of vehicle turning off the engine and type of fuel economy-maximizing behavior.
- Hang gliding, an air sport in which a pilot flies a light and unmotorized foot-launchable aircraft called a hang glider
- Paragliding, an air sport in which a pilot flies a foot-launched unmotorized aircraft with a frameless wing called a paraglider
- Ski Gliding or speed riding, an air sport in which a pilot flies a small fabric wing whilst on skis
- List of airline flights that required gliding

== See also ==
- Flying and gliding animals
- Glide (disambiguation)
- Glider (disambiguation)
