= Windows96.net =

Windows operating system parody

- Website type: Browser-based "web OS" / web desktop (parody)
- Website: https://windows96.net/
- Launched: 2019

Windows96.net (also known as Windows 96) is a browser-based parody of a Microsoft Windows–style operating system presented as a web desktop. It imagines a fictional Windows release between Windows 95 and Windows 98.

== Functionality ==
The site includes a live chat program for users currently online. A package manager allows one-click installation of programs, including the shareware version of Doom and a Half-Life demo.

GIGAZINE described the project as created using browser technologies such as HTML5, CSS, JavaScript and WebAssembly, and noted that some applications are unimplemented.

== Reception ==
PC Gamer described Windows96.net as "surprisingly fleshed out" for a browser-based parody OS. FAZ characterised it as a functional homage to early Windows releases and highlighted features such as a live chat and the ability to load games like Doom.

== See also ==
- Windows 93
- Retrocomputing
