= ZeroPC =

Web desktop

ZeroPC was a commercial webtop developed by ZeroDesktop, Inc. located in San Mateo, California. ZeroPC has been called a personal cloud OS. It mimicked the look, feel and functionality of the desktop environment of a real operating system. The software was launched in September 2011 through Disrupt SF 2011 event and recently selected to the finalist of SXSW 2012 in Innovative Web Technology category. ZeroPC is web-based and required a Java applet to operate bundled productivity tool Thinkfree. The web applications found on ZeroPC are built on Java in the back end. Features included drag-and-drop functionality, cloud dashboard and personal cloud storage meta services.

ZeroPC belonged to a category of services that intended to turn the Web into a full-fledged platform by using Web services as a foundation along with presentation technologies that replicated the experience of desktop applications for users. ZeroPC aggregates content so users can easily access, transfer and share whatever content they want, using a web browser from any device. Its meta-cloud layer supports Dropbox, Box, SugarSync, OneDrive, 4Shared, Google Drive, Evernote, Picasa, Flickr, Instagram, Facebook, Twitter, and Photobucket. ZeroPC Cloud OS platform also provides extensive APIs for iOS and Android App developers.

Some of the features found on ZeroPC are: File sharing, Webmail, Cloud Content Navigator, Instant messenger, Sticky Note, Audio/Video Player and Office productivity applications.

ZeroPC 2.0 platform ran on AWS for free and paid users. Its platform is licensable to Telco and ISV for commercial purpose. Their clients are SFR, SK Telecom, Hancom and others.

As of June 1, 2017, ZeroPC's servers were switched off completely, and ZeroPC is no longer in service since its parent company, NComputing, had launched Virtual Desktop Service in the cloud (AWS) to public.

== Browser and Platform Compatibility ==
The ZeroPC web desktop was compatible with Mac OS X and Microsoft Windows platforms. It is certified to operate on Safari 6.0, Firefox 15.0.1, Google Chrome 22.0.1229.79 m and Internet Explorer 8 and 9.

The ZeroPC front end user interface executes entirely within a web browser (see above) and uses HTML, some features of HTML5, JavaScript, AJAX and an optional Java plug-in.

== Security ==
All communication between the ZeroPC front end user interface and the ZeroPC back end servers is encrypted using SSL (HTTPS) protocol. Furthermore, any content stored in the ZeroPC server-side repository is also encrypted using 256-bit Advanced Encryption Standard (AES-256) by Amazon S3 on AWS.

ZeroPC users could connect their ZeroPC profile to other storage services such as Dropbox and Box. This connection allows the ZeroPC user to fully manage their content stored in these other storage services. To establish the connection ZeroPC rigorously adhered to the Oauth implementation provided by the target storage service. Upon completion of the Oauth process, ZeroPC stores the relevant access token in the user's profile. This token, along with all other sensitive password related data was encrypted using AES 256-bit key size.

== Implementations ==
As noted above, the ZeroPC platform was hosted on Amazon Web Services infrastructure and is available to the general consumer. A user was allowed to sign up by selecting one of three account plans including a no-cost option.

The ZeroPC could also be white-labeled for organizations wishing to provide this functionality to their own users. The white-label options include managed hosting on Amazon Web Services infrastructure and also installation within the organization's IT infrastructure.

== User Access Points ==
The ZeroPC infrastructure provided user access to content and features in several different ways. As described in this article the user can access their information by signing into the ZeroPC web desktop. Additionally, ZeroPC offers native applications designed to run on popular mobile devices including smartphones and tablets.

== Leadership ==
ZeroPC was founded by Chief Executive Officer, Young Song, an entrepreneur who previously founded NComputing, a $60 million venture-backed company. He also co-founded eMachines, Inc., a low-cost computer brand (later acquired by Gateway).

== See also ==
- Qubes OS
- Web portal
- Web desktop
- Cloud Storage
