= Glider =

Glider or Gliders may refer to:

== Aircraft and transport ==
=== Aircraft ===
- Glider (aircraft), heavier-than-air aircraft primarily intended for unpowered flight
  - Glider (sailplane), a rigid-winged glider aircraft with an undercarriage, used in the sport of gliding
  - Motor glider, heavier-than-air aircraft intended for powered or unpowered flight

=== Other transport ===
- Glider (automobiles), a vehicle without a powertrain
- Glider (Belfast), a bus rapid transit system in Belfast, Northern Ireland
- Underwater glider, a submarine propelled by changing buoyancy

== Animals ==
- There are at least eight marsupial mammals with the name "glider". They are in two families within the suborder Phalangeriformes
  - Greater glider, Petauroides volans
  - Feathertail glider or pygmy gliding possum, Acrobates pygmaeus
  - Biak glider, Petaurus biacensis
  - Mahogany glider, Petaurus gracilis
  - Northern glider, Petaurus abidi
  - Squirrel glider, Petaurus norfolcensis
  - Sugar glider, Petaurus breviceps
  - Yellow-bellied glider or fluffy glider, Petaurus australis
  - Ring-tailed glider, Tous ayamaruensis

== Computing and video games ==
- Glider (bot), an Internet bot for automating World of Warcraft gameplay
- Glider (Conway's Life), a pattern in Conway's Game of Life, also used as a hacker emblem
- Glider (video game), a 1988 Apple Macintosh game by John Calhoun

== Music ==
- Glider (The Sight Below album), 2008
- Glider (Tokio album) or the title song, 2003
- Glider (EP) or the title song, by My Bloody Valentine, 1990
- "Glider" (Boyfriend song), 2016
- "Glider", a song by Tycho from Epoch, 2016

== Other uses ==
- Glider (furniture), a type of swinging seat
- Gliders India, an Indian state-owned defence company
- Glider Ushñahua (1968–2020), Peruvian politician
- Gliders (Elfquest), a fictional tribe of elves in the comic book series Elfquest
- Australia women's national wheelchair basketball team, nicknamed the Gliders

== See also ==
- Gimli Glider, an Air Canada 767 which glided to a successful landing after running out of fuel in 1983
- Glide (disambiguation)
- Gliding (disambiguation)
- Flying and gliding animals
