= Glide (software) =

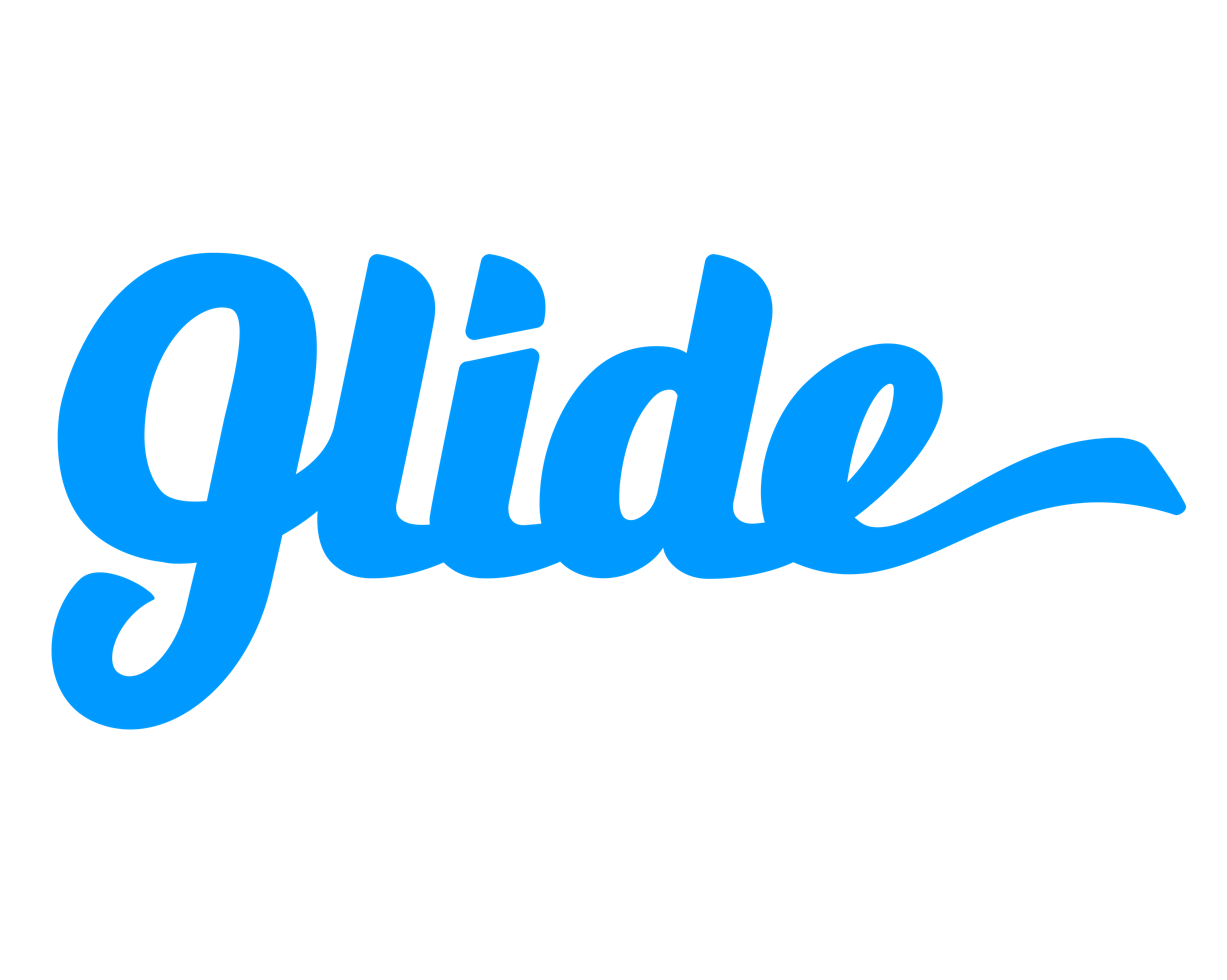
- Original author: Glide Talk Ltd.
- Operating system: iOS, Android, Windows Phone
- Type: Instant messaging
- Website: glide.me

Glide is an instant video messaging platform for iOS, Android, and Windows mobile devices.

The app enables a user to live stream broadcast brief video clips, in a similar way as sending text messages. Glide communicates through WiFi, 3G, 4G, and LTE. Users have the ability to send private videos up to five minutes to a desired list of contacts. Recipients have the freedom to watch and respond to the video instantly or later. All messages can be watched anytime and saved on the cloud. This Jerusalem-based startup was founded by Jonathan Caras, Adam Korbl, and Ari Roisman on May 15, 2012, and was launched to the public in March 2013.

Glide won the Techcrunch Startup Battlefield Audience Choice award at the publication's disrupt New York Technology conference in 2013.

In 2015, Glide reported having more than 15 million active users.
