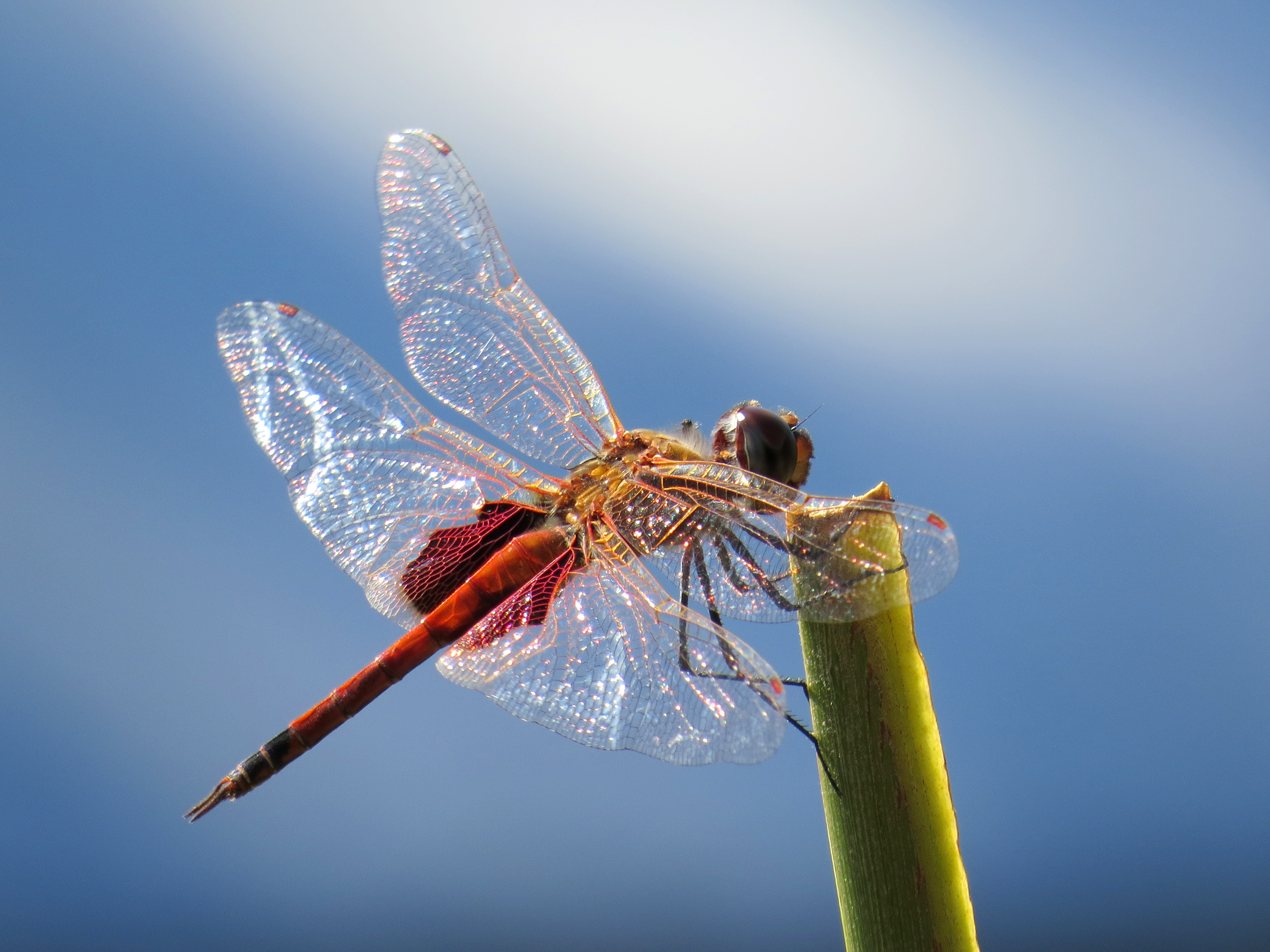
- Male in Darwin, Australia
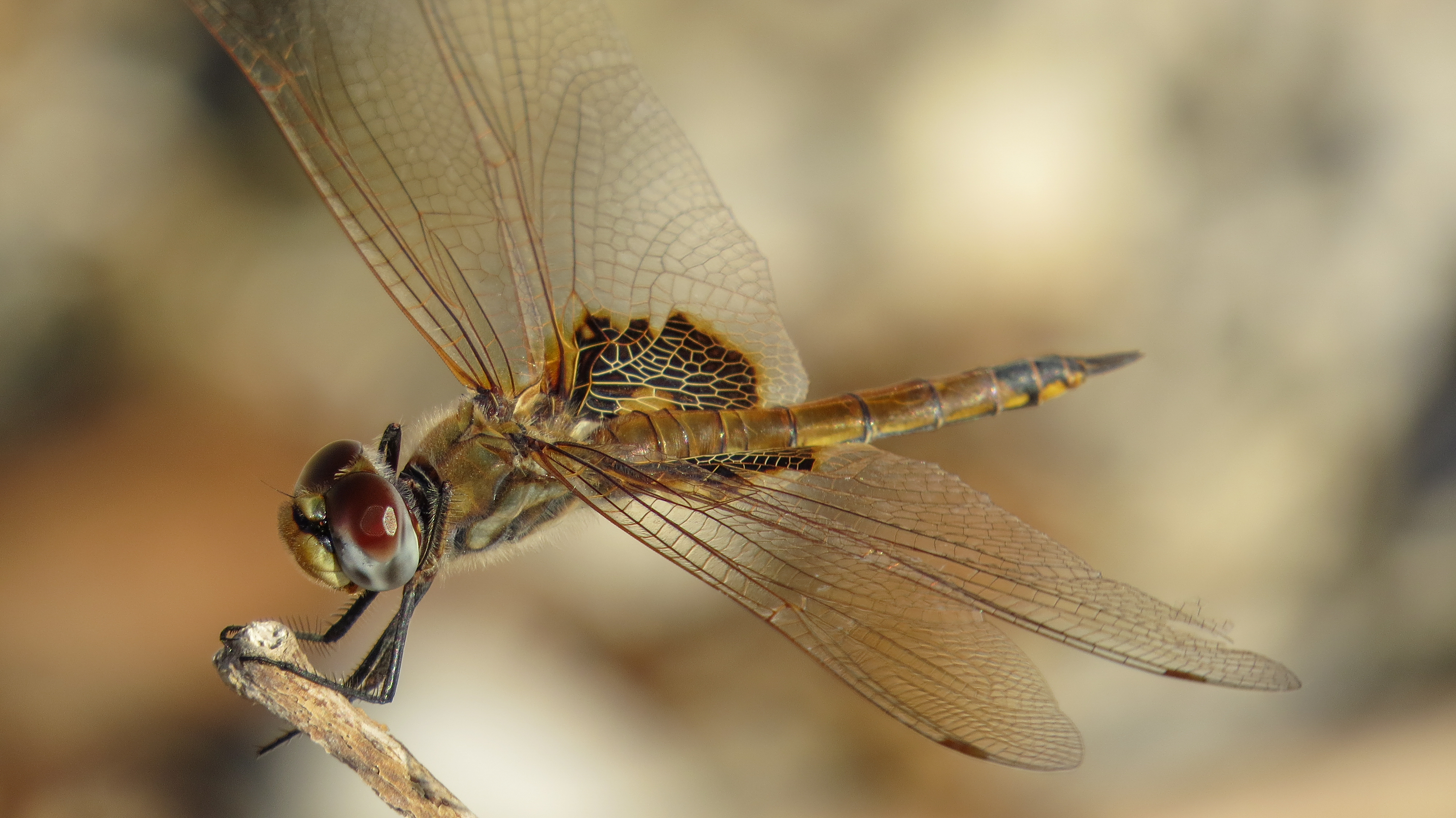
- Female

Conservation status
- Least Concern (IUCN 3.1)

Scientific classification
- Kingdom: Animalia
- Phylum: Arthropoda
- Clade: Pancrustacea
- Class: Insecta
- Order: Odonata
- Infraorder: Anisoptera
- Superfamily: Libelluloidea
- Family: Libellulidae
- Genus: Tramea
- Species: T. loewii

Binomial name
- Tramea loewii Kaup, 1866

Synonyms
- Tramea tillyardi Lieftinck, 1942

= Tramea loewii =

Species of dragonfly

Tramea loewii, commonly known as the common glider, is a species of dragonfly in the family Libellulidae.

It occurs from Indonesia and New Guinea through Australia and the western Pacific to New Caledonia. The species is recently self-introduced to New Zealand.

Tramea loewii is a medium to large dragonfly with dark patches at the base of the hindwings, a striped thorax, and a red abdomen in males.

== Taxonomic history ==
In 1866, Brauer published the description of Tramea loewii using the manuscript name proposed by Kaup. Brauer noted that Kaup had already assigned names to many specimens sent to him for study, and that he generally retained those names unless they were already occupied.

In 1942, Lieftinck reviewed Indo-Australian populations of Tramea loewii and described the Australian form as Tramea loewii tillyardi. He regarded the Australian populations as closely related to specimens from Ceram and western New Guinea, differing mainly in thoracic colouration and minor differences in the male genitalia.

Tramea tillyardi is now treated as a synonym of Tramea loewii.

== Description ==
Tramea loewii is a medium to large dragonfly with a wingspan of about 85 mm and a body length of about 45 mm.

The thorax is striped yellowish to brown on a purplish background. Males have a red abdomen with black markings near the tip, while females are dull brown. Dark patches at the base of the hindwings are characteristic of the species; these patches are red in males and brown in females.

Tramea loewii is similar in appearance to Tramea stenoloba, but differs in the colouration of the thorax and the structure of the secondary genitalia.

== Distribution and habitat ==
Tramea loewii inhabits a wide range of still-water habitats including ponds, swamps and lagoons.

In Australia it is widespread except for the far south-west of the continent.

== Etymology ==
The genus name Tramea is derived from the Latin trameare ("to pass through" or "travel across"), referring to the migratory or vagrant behaviour of species in the genus.

The former genus name Trapezostigma is derived from the Greek τραπέζιον (trapezion, "trapezium") and στίγμα (stigma, "spot" or "mark"), likely referring to the shape of the pterostigma.

In 1866, J. J. Kaup named this species löwii, now loewii, an eponym honouring either the German entomologist Hermann Loew (1807–1879) or the Austrian physician and entomologist Franz Löw (1829–1889).

== Gallery ==
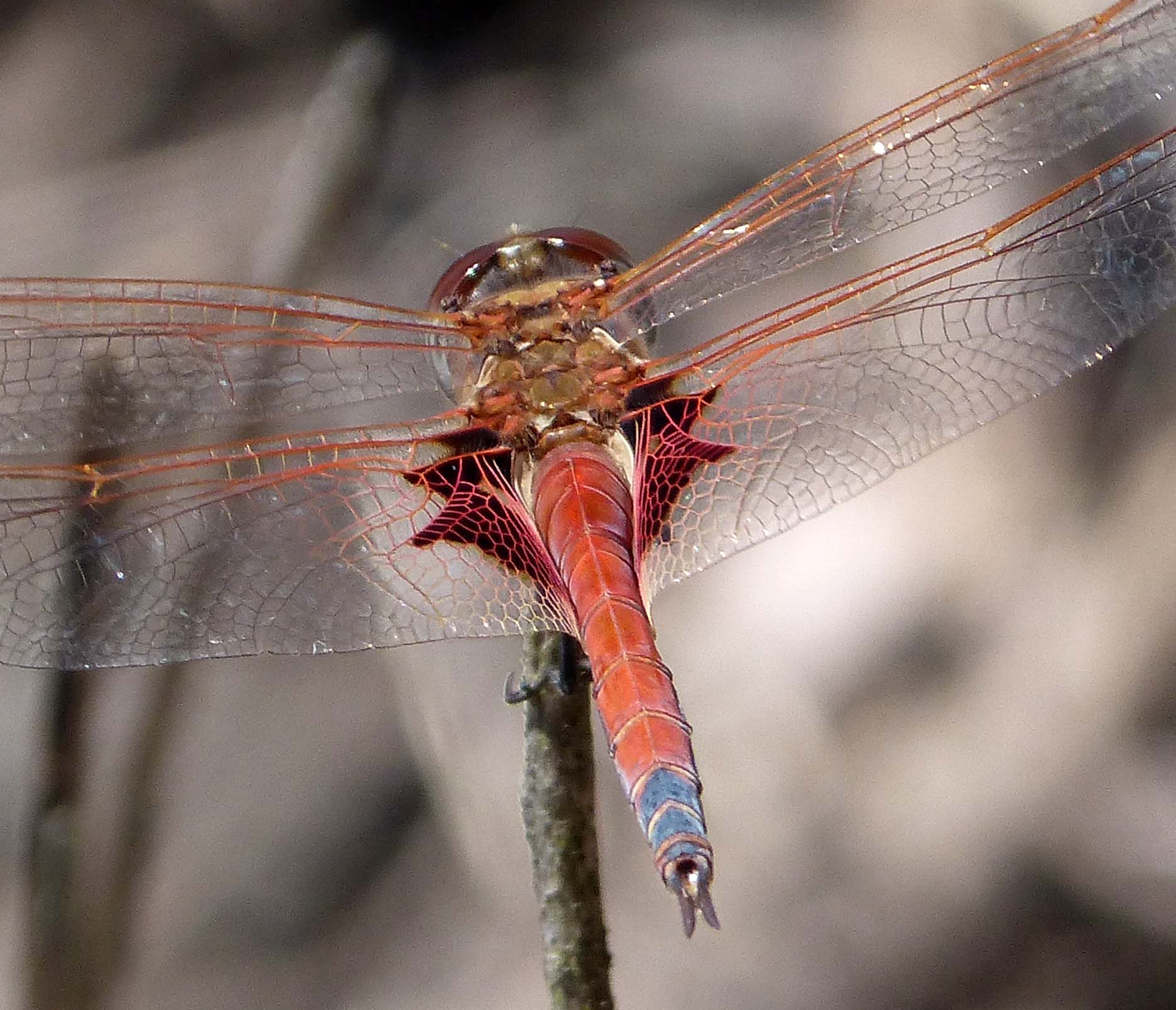
Male common glider has a red abdomen with black markings near the tip

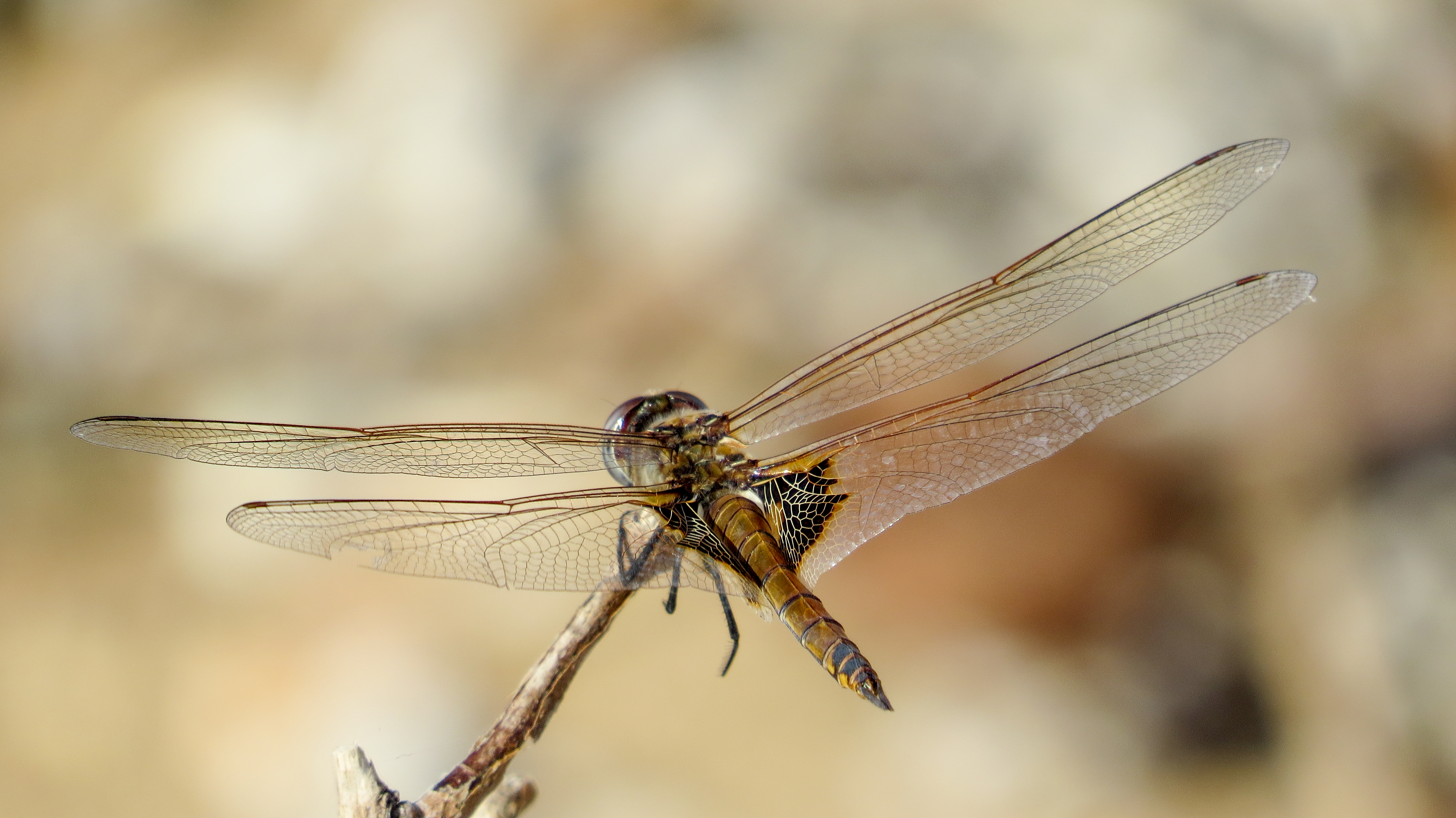
Female common glider has a brown abdomen with black markings near the tip

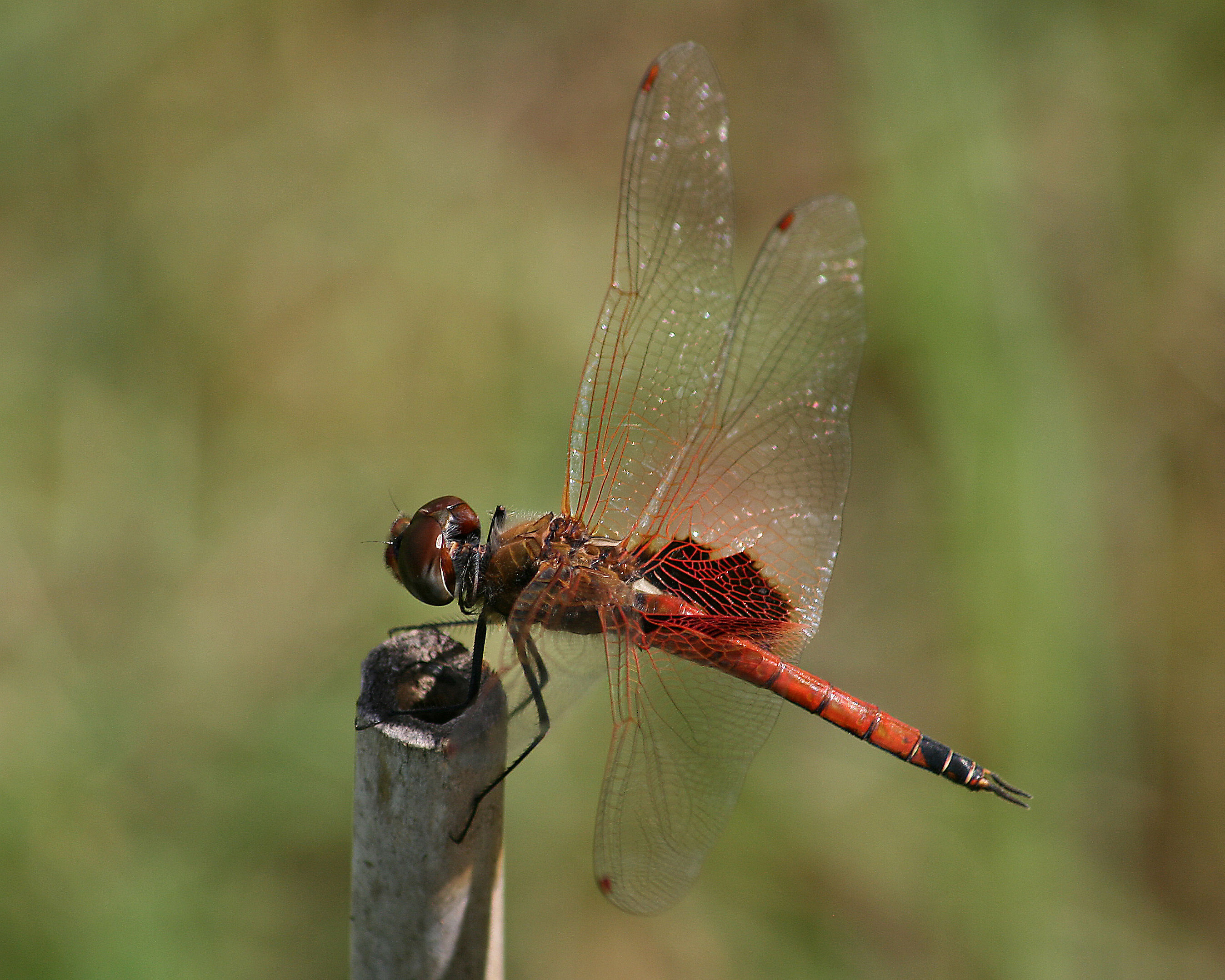
Male viewed from the side

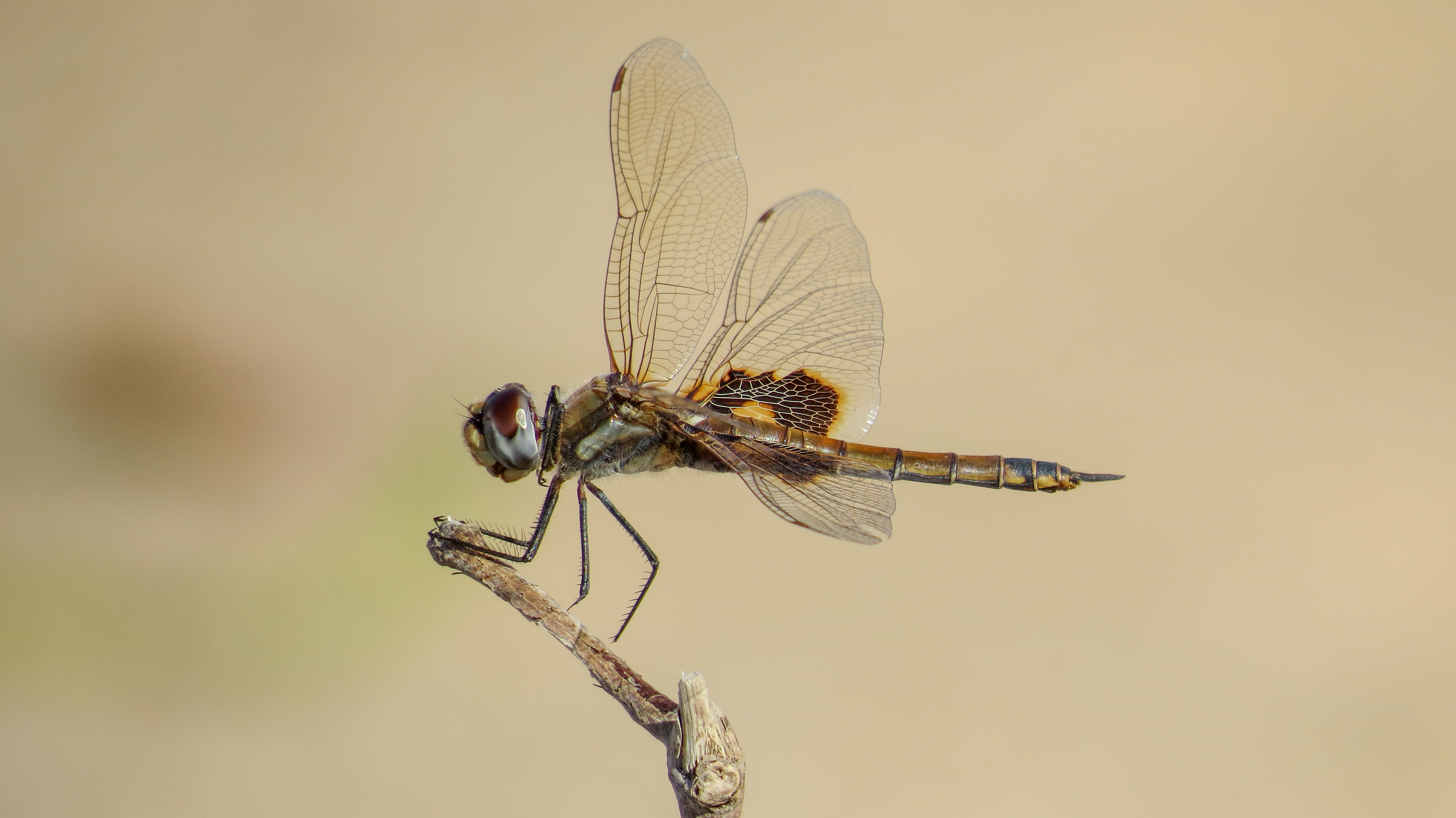
Female viewed from the side

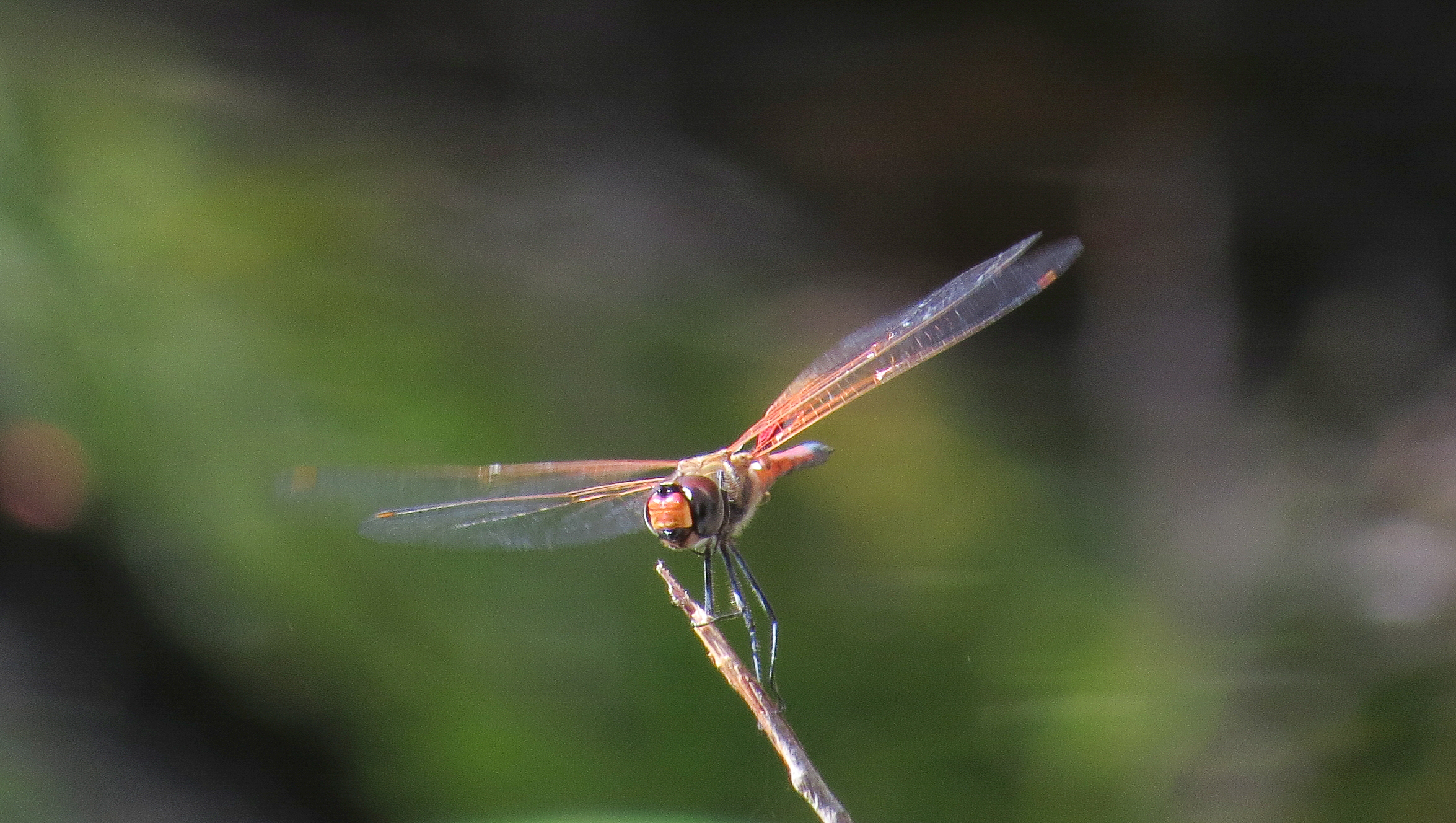
Male face

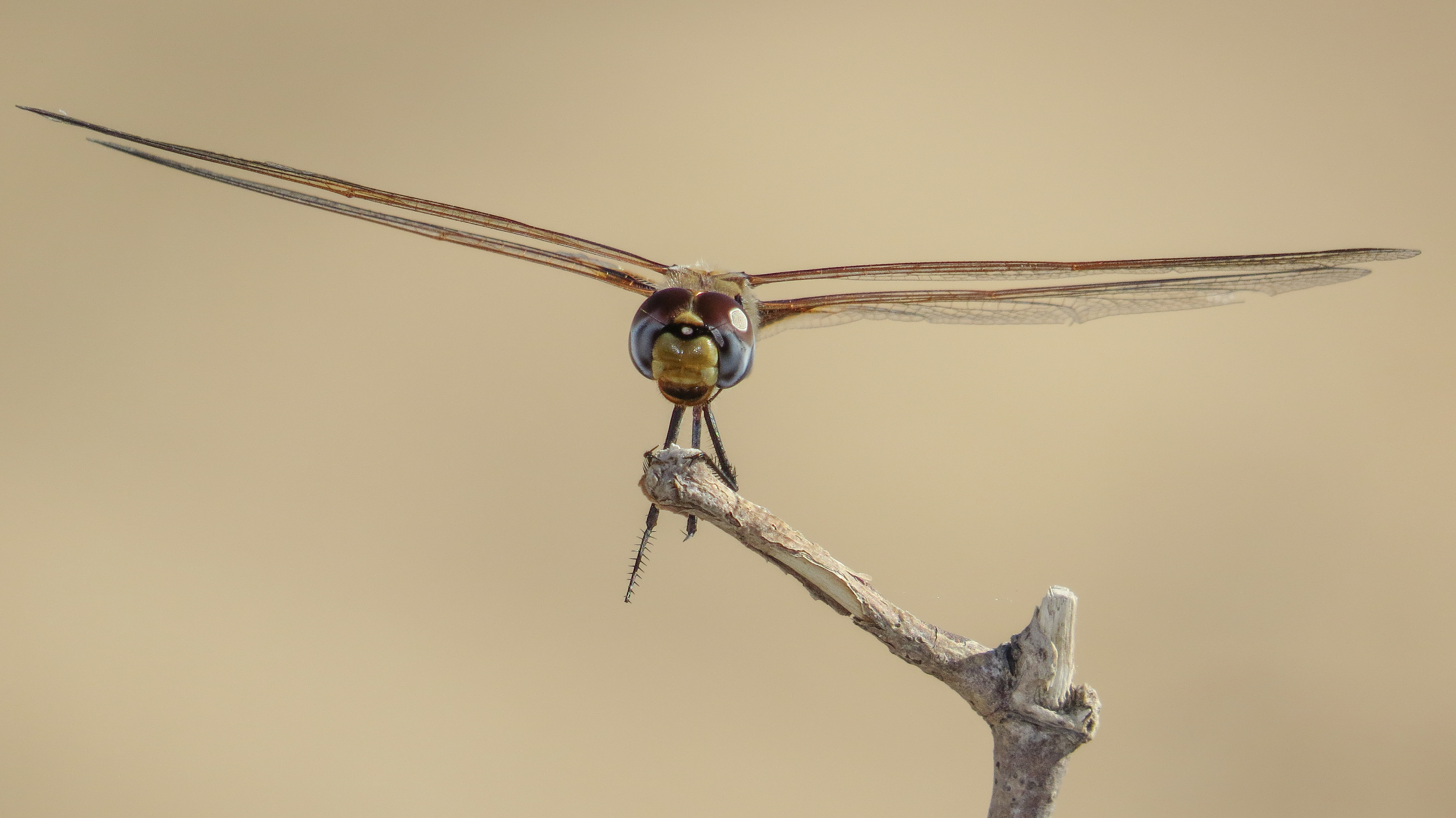
Female face

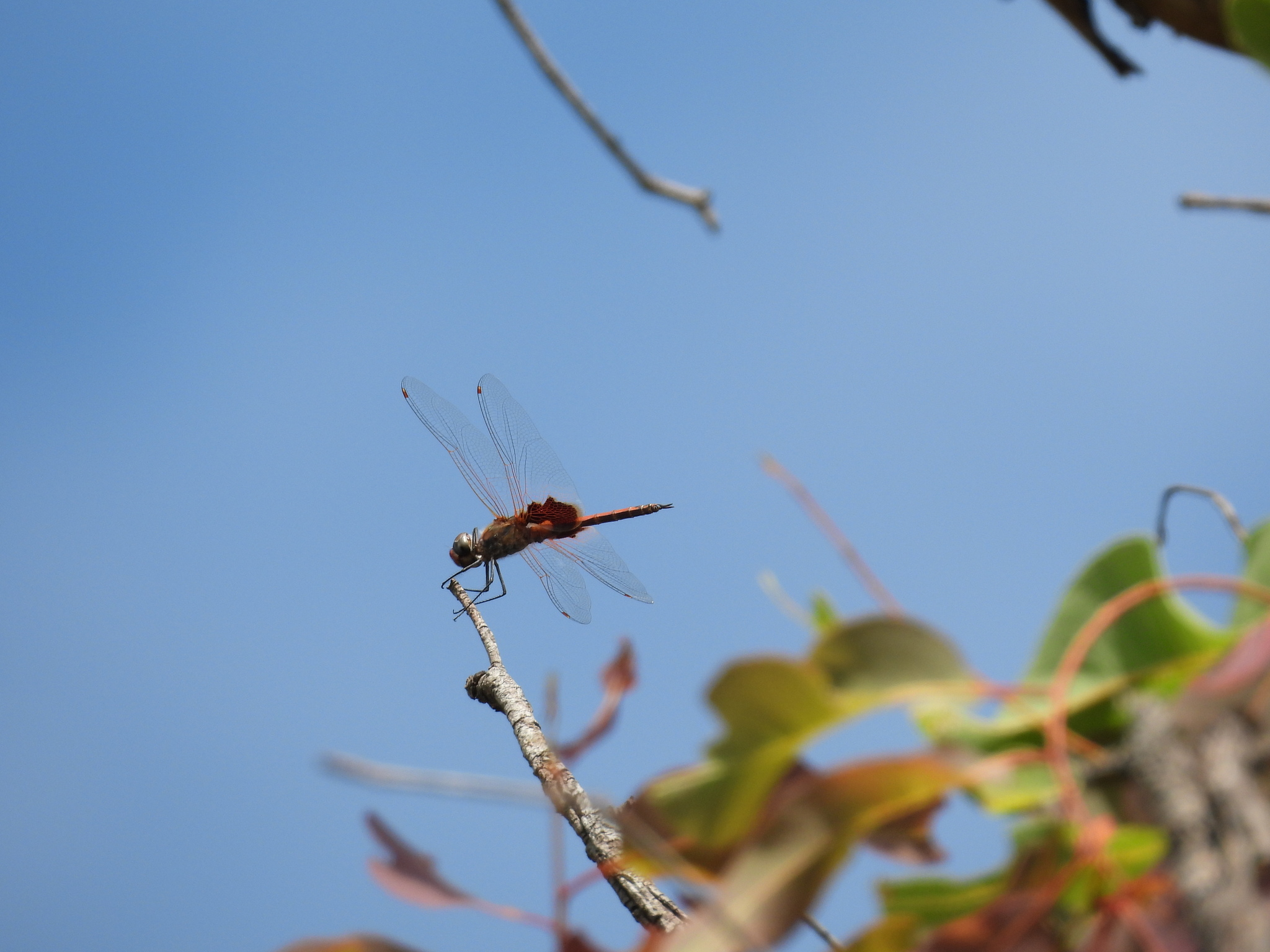
Male

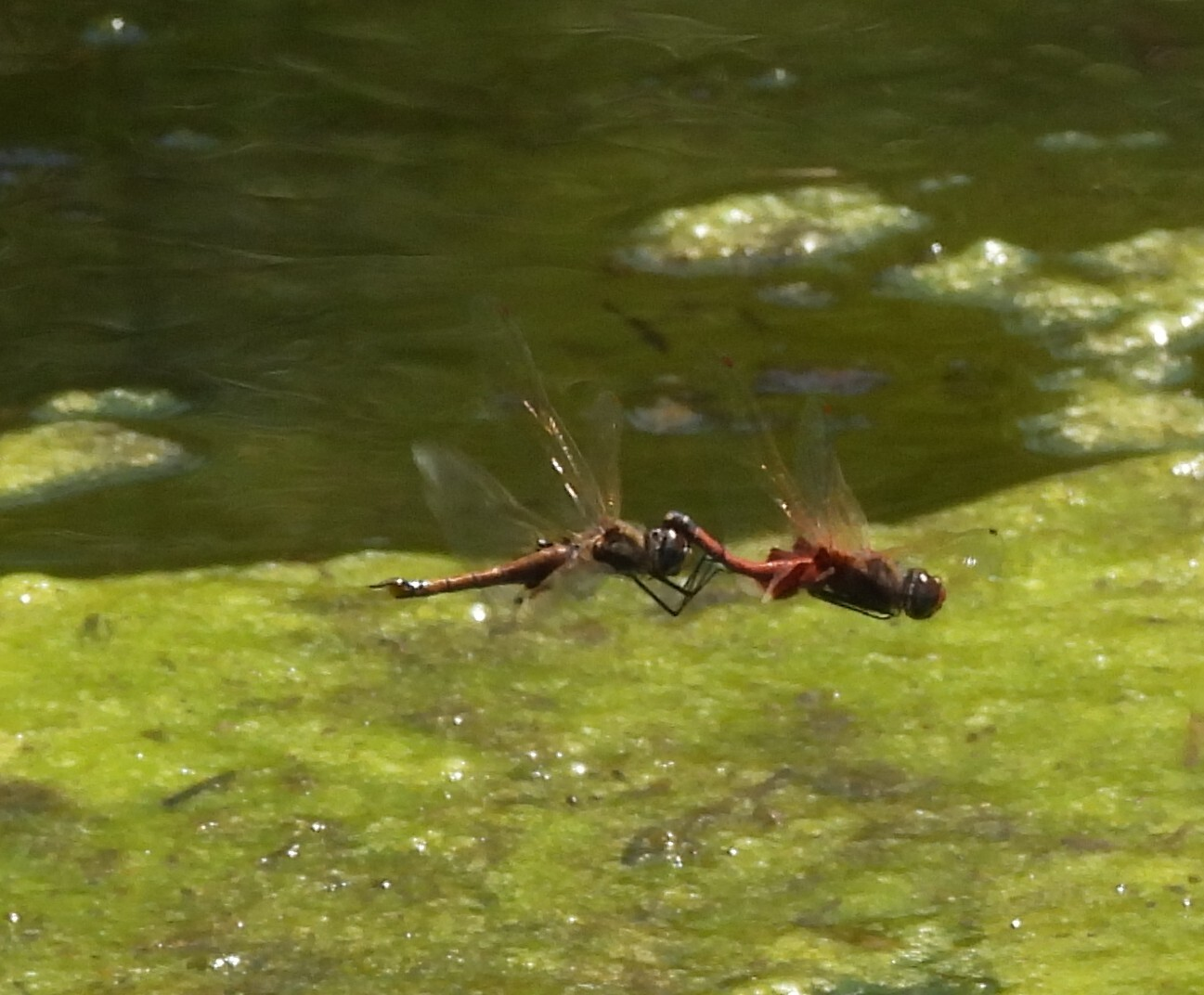
Male and female joined

Illustration of male Tramea wing venation

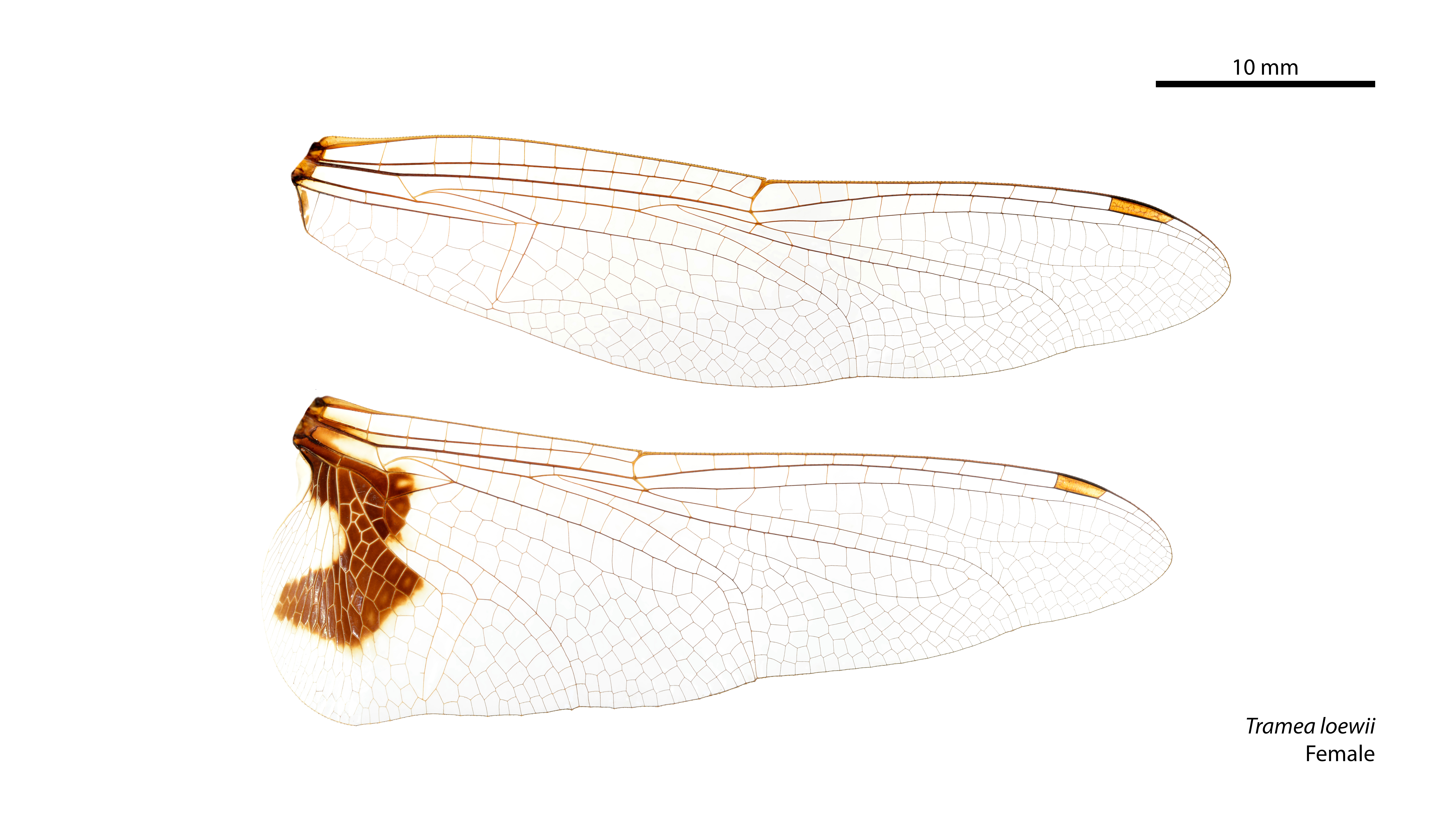
Photo of female wings

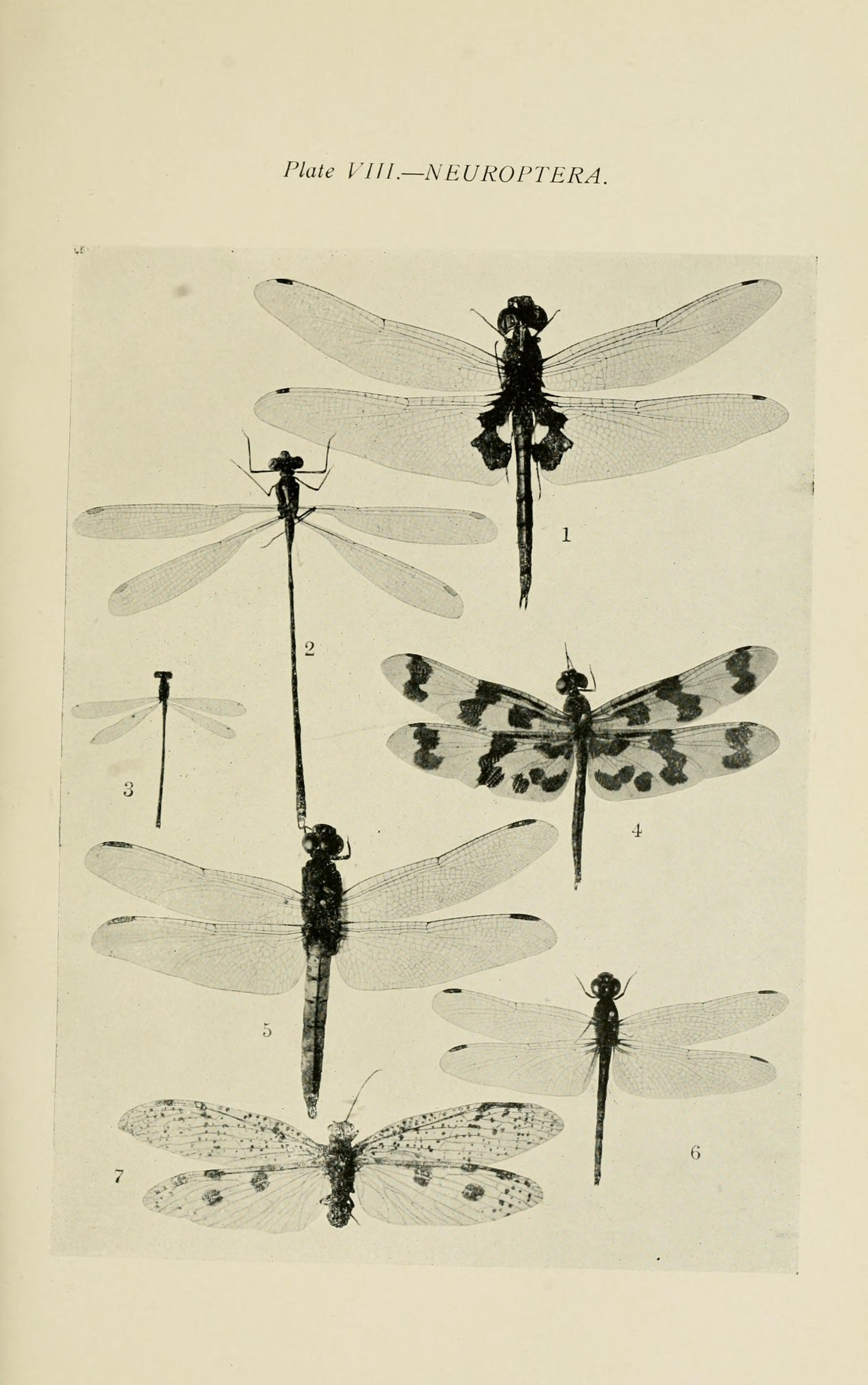
1. Tramea loewii from Australian Insects 1907
