= USS Glide =

Two ships in the United States Navy have been named USS Glide:

- USS Glide (1862), was a gunboat, launched in 1862 and burned in 1863
- USS Glide (1863), was a sternwheeler, launched in 1863 and decommissioned in 1865
