= Hosted desktop =

Cloud computing service

A hosted desktop is a product set within the larger cloud-computing sphere generally delivered using a combination of technologies including hardware virtualization and some form of remote connection software, Citrix XenApp or Microsoft Remote Desktop Services being two of the most common. Processing takes place within the provider's datacenter environment with traffic between the datacenter and the client being primarily display updates, mouse movements and keyboard activity (additional traffic will be generated by audio and print jobs).

A hosted desktop commonly involves a browser-based connection to a desktop environment which includes an office productivity suite alongside other desktop applications. The desktop is hosted, run, delivered and supported from a central location, usually a secure data center with high-quality and resilient connections to the Internet/cloud. Cloud Desktop is a term often used to refer to a container of a collection of virtual objects, software, hardware, configurations etc., residing on the cloud, used by a client to interact with remote services and perform computer related tasks.

Connecting clients run pre-installed or downloaded viewer applications via one of many remote desktop protocols. Clients can include thin clients, PCs, workstations, mobile and handheld devices running a variety of operating systems such as Windows, Mac OS X, Linux and others.

The move towards hosted desktops, of which virtual desktop infrastructure (VDI) is a subset, is predicted by Gartner to account for 49 million business desktops by 2013 equal to more than 40 percent of the worldwide professional PC market. The development of applications by service providers such as Google and Microsoft have accelerated this process, as has the evolution of new licensing schemes which allow fee-paying based on a subscription rather than on purchase.

== Key characteristics ==
The centralized nature of hosted desktops can overcome common issues with mobile working, delivery of a common infrastructure across physical sites, disaster recovery, cost control and scaling up and down in timely fashion.

Hosted desktop services can be a comparatively simple method for applying outsourcing principles within a business although care is warranted in ensuring service provider quality to ensure compliance, data security and data protection standards meet requirements.

A hosted desktop based environment will generally migrate user authentication, file and print services and application delivery and data storage to the cloud making it accessible via secure connections from any internet enabled location. The relatively small bandwidth requirements for a Hosted Desktop means that between 5 and 10 people can connect and work on a standard xDSL broadband, whilst a single user can operate quite effectively on a 3G mobile data connection.

Hosted desktops are most often based on Windows Server 2008 utilizing Remote Desktop Services, often with an additional management layer from vendors like Citrix Systems or Parallels Remote Application Server to make personalization easier. Licensing for this type of hosted desktop is provided by the Microsoft Service Provider License Agreement (SPLA), a special type of end-user license agreement. The user rents the appropriate licenses as part of the monthly fee paid to the service provider and receives automatic upgrade rights to the latest version of the software as part of the agreement.

Backup and disaster recovery are handled by the Hosted Desktop vendor, with some solutions also offering failover to alternate datacenters.

== Pricing models ==
For hosted desktop vendors utilizing VMware and Microsoft technology, charges are normally monthly with a basic charge applied for each user of a hosted desktop and then additional charges for an office productivity suite, additional data storage and extra applications. Some vendors wrap a suite of the most common applications into product sets to simplify still further.

== See also ==
- Remote desktop software
- Desktop virtualization
- Web desktop
- Omnissa Horizon
- Thin client
