= Glide OS =

Web desktop

- Developer: Jumptuit
- Stable release: 4.0
- Written in: HTML5
- Type: Web OS

Glide OS was a cross-platform web desktop developed by Jumptuit. It was notable for operating on both desktop operating systems, like Microsoft Windows, Mac OS X and Linux and its contemporary mobile operating systems like Apple iOS, Google Android and Honeycomb, BlackBerry OS and BlackBerry Tablet OS (QNX), webOS, Symbian and Windows Mobile. Glide OS was compatible with a variety of web browsers, including Microsoft Internet Explorer, Mozilla Firefox, Apple Safari, and Google Chrome.

== History ==
Jumptuit (originally TransMedia) was founded by Donald Leka. He began to develop a cloud computing platform that could manage media across proprietary platforms. The Company shifted its focus from business clients to consumers unveiling Glide at the National Association of Broadcasters (NAB) Convention on April 18, 2005 and launching a free consumer version on November 30, 2005.

The latest HTML5 version of Glide was 4.0 and was presented at the Harvard University Cyberposium 16 Technology Conference on November 13, 2010. The previous version, 3.0, was launched on May 20, 2008 at the All Things Digital Conference (AllThingsD).

In 2006, Intel announced plans to include Glide on ultra-mobile PCs. However the project has not manifested as a consumer product.

Glide provided support for most tablets of its day, including the Apple iPad, HP Touchpad, BlackBerry Playbook, Samsung Galaxy, Motorola XOOM and most recently the Amazon Kindle Fire and Barnes & Noble Nook Tablet.

Glide OS and the Company have won numerous awards, including PC World's Top 100 Products of the Year, Laptop Magazine's Top 50 Products of the Year, EContent Magazine's Top 100 Companies of the Year and Red Herring's Top 100 Companies of the Year among others.

== Features ==
Glide featured a desktop-like interface which displayed the Desktop, Glide HD, and Web Portal. Glide included several web-based applications, including an integrated office suite, media players, photo editor, calendar software, webmail, address book, micro-blogging service, publishing platform and Internet search client.
