= Web desktop =

Desktop environment that runs in a web browser

A web desktop or webtop is a desktop environment embedded in a web browser or similar client application. A webtop integrates web applications, web services, client–server applications, application servers, and applications on the local client into a desktop environment using the desktop metaphor. Web desktops provide an environment similar to that of Windows, Mac, or a graphical user interface on Unix and Linux systems. It is a virtual desktop running in a web browser. In a webtop the applications, data, files, configuration, settings, and access privileges reside remotely over the network. Much of the computing takes place remotely. The browser is primarily used for display and input purposes.

The terms "web desktop" and "webtop" are distinct from web operating system, a network operating system such as TinyOS or distributed operating system such as Inferno. In popular use, web desktops are sometimes referred to incorrectly as web operating systems or simply WebOS.

== History ==
In the context of a web desktop, the term Webtop was first introduced by the Santa Cruz Operation (SCO) in 1994 for a web-based interface to their Unix operating system. This application was based on the provisional application entitled "The Adaptive Internet Protocol System" filed 13 November 1997, serial number 60/065,521 and is the U.S. patent for the technology used in the Tarantella Webtop. Andy Bovingdon and Ronald Joe Record, who both explored the concepts in different directions, are often credited as the inventors. The initial SCO Webtop, developed by Record, utilized a Netscape Navigator plugin to display applications in a browser window via TightVNC. A trademark application for SCO Webtop was filed with the U.S. Patent and Trademark Office on November 8, 1996. To avoid confusion with the more complex technology incorporated into the Tarantella Webtop SCO abandoned it on 24 December 1997.

Bovingdon's three tiered architecture (TTA) concept was launched as the Tarantella Webtop. This technology originated from early commercial use of web server technology by SCO. the first OS vendor to include a commercial web server, NCSA HTTPd, and commercial web browser, NCSA Mosaic. Their X.desktop product line, obtained when they acquired IXI Limited in the UK, was the first to have icons for URLs (controlled via the Deskshell scripting language) and an HTML-based help system, named DeskHelp, which extended the NCSA Mosaic web browser to include APIs and scripting linked to the X.desktop product for interactive control. The IXI Limited scripting language based on Python was later replaced with JavaScript. Tarantella allowed real Unix and Windows applications to be displayed within a web browser through the use of Java to form a true web based desktop or Webtop.

The first SCO Webtop releases were part of SCO Skunkware before being integrated into SCO OpenServer version 5 and UnixWare 7. Tarantella was subsequently purchased by Sun Microsystems and integrated into their Sun Secure Global Desktop.

Byte magazine referred to the Webtop as a network user interface (NUI).

In June 2011, Google released an operating system for web connection named ChromeOS and several 11-12" netbooks from Acer and Samsung have implemented the system. It made up a useful fraction (~10%) of 2012 netbook sales.

== Advantages ==
Convenience
A personalized desktop on every supported client device
Mobility
Access your desktop anywhere there is a supported client device
Session management
Server-side session management allows roaming users to access restored sessions from anywhere
Software management

- Ensures all users are running the same current versions of all applications
- Updates and patches need only be applied to the server - no need to update multiple clients
- No need for software to distribute software over the network

Security

- Less prone to typical attacks, viruses, worms, unpatched clients, vulnerabilities
- Sensitive data stored on secure servers rather than scattered across multiple potentially unprotected and vulnerable clients (e.g. smart phones and laptops)
- Encrypted transmission of all data between server and clients (e.g. https)
- Software Management features (above) accommodate quick and easy application of security advisories on server side
- Webtop administrator can control which applications and data each user is allowed to access

High availability

- From a single device access Windows, UNIX, Linux, and Mainframe applications, all at the same time
- Minimal hardware requirements for client devices (except for rendered technologies such as Flash/Flex/SilverLight)
- Less downtime - robust server system more easily protected and less likely to fail than multiple client desktops
- Fault tolerance - if a client device fails for any reason simply replace it with any other supported client device without loss of data, configuration, preferences, or application access

== Drawbacks ==
Security
Because all data is transferred over the internet, it might be possible for a cracker to intercept the connection and read data. Although with the use of https 256-bit encryption and access control lists, this can be safe-guarded.
Speed
When using a web desktop the whole code used for visualization (.js/.css files, Flash player files, etc.) needs to be transferred to the local computer, so that it can be displayed. Further, network latency or congestion can intermittently slow webtop activity. Offline application storage can mitigate this issue.
Application features
Some webtop-delivered applications may not contain the full feature set of their traditional desktop counterparts.
Network Access
Web desktops require access to a network. If a client device is misconfigured or the network is unreachable, then the web desktop is unavailable.
Controlled access
In some webtop implementations and deployments, a user's access to some applications and data can be restricted. This is also viewed as an advantage of webtops but can be viewed as a drawback from the user's perspective.
Central control
The normal webtop user is unable to install additional applications or update existing applications. Updates typically must be performed by an administrator on the server side. Webtop users depend on the webtop administrator. In contrast, in a traditional desktop environment, a user can fix and/or break the system by installing new software or updates. This can also be seen as an advantage for webtops.

== Comparison of web desktops ==
The following tables compare general and technical information for several web desktops.

Name	Browser support	Developer	Engine	Free	License	3rd party applications	Productivity suite	Graphical user interface	Downloadable to Web server	Active
G.ho.st	IE6+, Firefox2+, Safari. Partial: Chrome & Opera	Ghost Inc ("G.ho.st")	Flash + Ajax (mobile version is WAP)	No	Proprietary	Yes	Yahoo! Zimbra, Zoho, Google Docs, ILoveIM	Windows-like	No	No
Glide OS	IE7, Firefox 3, Safari, Chrome	TransMedia	HTML5	Yes (30 GB limit)	Proprietary	From Glide Community	Glide Write, Glide Presenter, Glide Crunch, Photo Editor, Email	macOS+Windows-like	No	No
Nivio	IE7, IE8, Google Chrome, FF 4	Sachin Dev Duggal, Saurabh Dhoot	In development	No	Proprietary	Yes	Yes	Windows	No	No
Online OS	FF 1.5 and higher, IE7	iCUBE Network Solutions	Java, Ajax	Yes	Proprietary	Yes	Yes	Windows-like	No	No
Open-Xchange (OX) App Suite	FF, IE 9/10, Chrome, Safari	Open-Xchange	JavaScript, HTML5	Yes	Backend: GPLv2 Frontend: Creative Commons	Yes	Yes	Customizable	Yes	Yes
Oracle Secure Global Desktop	Any browser with a JRE	Oracle	AIP	No	Proprietary	Yes	Yes	Customizable	No	
VMware View	IE, Firefox, Safari, Opera, Chrome	VMware	PCoIP, RDP, HTML5	No	Proprietary	Yes	Yes	Customizable	No	Yes
ZeroPC	IE 8/9, Firefox v12.0+, Chrome, Safari	ZeroDesktop, Inc.	HTML, HTML5, JavaScript, Java Applet, Ajax	Yes	Proprietary	Yes	Thinkfree Office, Cloud Storage Mashup, IM	Windows-like	No	No
SilveOS	Chrome, Safari, Firefox, Opera, Edge	SilveOS	HTML5, JavaScript, Vue.js	Yes	Proprietary	Yes	Yes	Windows-like	Yes	Yes

== Pastiche and emulation ==
Many websites have made pastiches of retro operating system desktops, some by hobbyists.

== See also ==
- Comparison of remote desktop software
- Hosted desktop
- Online office suite
- Rich Internet application
- Windows96.net
- Virtual Network Computing
- Virtual Desktop Infrastructure
